= List of football clubs in Andorra =

This is a list of all the clubs playing in the Andorran football league system, under Federació Andorrana de Fútbol in the two amateur levels:

- Andorran First League (8 teams)
- Andorran Second League (15 teams)

FC Andorra does not play in the Andorran league, but plays in the Spanish league. Currently, the team plays in the Segunda División.

In bold are indicated eight teams winners Andorran First Division, Cup and Super Cup.

== Andorra First Division ==
| Team | Location |
|---|---|
| **UE Santa Coloma** | Santa Coloma d'Andorra, Andorra la Vella |
| **FC Santa Coloma** | Santa Coloma d'Andorra, Andorra la Vella |
| **UE Sant Julià** | Sant Julià de Lòria |
| **FC Lusitanos** | Andorra la Vella |
| **FC Encamp** | Encamp |
| FC Ordino | Ordino |
| Inter Club d'Escaldes | Escaldes-Engordany |
| UE Engordany | Escaldes-Engordany |

== Andorran Second Division ==
| +++ | Location |
|---|---|
| **FC Rànger's** | Andorra la Vella |
| **CE Principat** | Andorra la Vella |
| Casa Estrella del Benfica | Andorra la Vella |
| FS La Massana | La Massana |
| Atlètic Club d'Escaldes | Escaldes-Engordany |
| CE Jenlai | Escaldes-Engordany |
| Penya Encarnada d'Andorra | Andorra la Vella |
| UE Extremenya (also called FC Cerni or FC Francfurt Cerni) | La Massana |
| FC Santa Coloma B | Santa Coloma, Andorra la Vella |
| UE Santa Coloma B | Santa Coloma, Andorra la Vella |
| FC Lusitanos B | Andorra la Vella |
| UE Sant Julià B | Sant Julià de Lória |
| FC Ordino B | Ordino |
| FC Encamp B | Encamp |
| UE Engordany B | Escaldes-Engordany |

== Defunct Clubs ==
| Team | Location |
|---|---|
| **Constel·lació Esportiva** | Andorra la Vella |
| Sporting Club d'Escaldes | Escaldes-Engordany |
| Spordany Juvenil | Escaldes-Engordany |
| FC Andorra Veterans | Andorra la Vella |
| FC Aldosa (also called Montanbaldosa) | L'Aldosa de la Massana, La Massana |
| CE Benito | Sant Julià de Lòria |
| FC Engolasters (also called Joieries Aurum) | Engolasters, Escaldes-Engordany |
| Gimnàstic Valira (also called Assegurances Doval) | ? |
| UE Les Bons | Les Bons, Encamp |
| Costruccions Emprimo | ? |
| Magatzems Lima | La Massana |
| Racing d'Andorra | Andorra la Vella |
