= 2014 Copa Constitució =

Tournament details
- Country: Andorra

Final positions
- Champions: UE Sant Julià
- Runners-up: Lusitanos

Tournament statistics
- Matches played: 28
- Goals scored: 141 (5.04 per match)

The 2014 Copa Constitució is the 22nd season of Andorra's football knockout tournament. The competition began on 11 January 2014 with the matches of the first elimination round and ended on 2014 with the final. UE Santa Coloma are the defending champions. The winners will earn a place in the first qualifying round of the 2014–15 UEFA Europa League.

== Results ==
=== First round ===
This round was entered fourteen 2013–14 Segona Divisió teams at the time of the mid-season break: UE Engordany, UE Extremenya, Ordino B, Lusitanos B, CE Benfica, Atlètic Club d'Escaldes, FS La Massana, Rànger's, Encamp B, Jenlai, Encarnada, Sant Julià B, Principat B, FC Santa Coloma B. The matches were played on 11 and 12 January 2014.

Team 1	Score	Team 2
UE Engordany	7–3 (a.e.t.)	Extremenya
CE Benfica	3–3 (3–2 p)	Atlètic Club d'Escaldes
Ordino B	0–8	Lusitanos B
FS La Massana	3–5	Rànger's
Encamp B	3–2	Jenlai
Encarnada	1–2	Sant Julià B
Principat B	3–2	FC Santa Coloma B

=== Second round ===
This round was entered by the top 2013–14 Segona Divisió team at the time of the mid-season break: UE Santa Coloma B and will join the winners of the first round. The matches were played on 26 January 2014.

Team 1	Score	Team 2
CE Benfica	0–1	Encamp B
Principat B	2–3	Rànger's
UE Engordany	4–2 (a.e.t.)	Lusitanos B
Sant Julià B	1–8	UE Santa Coloma B

=== Third round ===
This round was entered by the teams placed fifth to eighth after 10 rounds played in 2013–14 Primera Divisió. The matches were played on 2 February 2014.

Team 1	Score	Team 2
Encamp B	3–2	Principat
Rànger's	0–11	Ordino
UE Engordany	3–1	Inter Club d'Escaldes
UE Santa Coloma B	3–3 (4–5 p)	Encamp

=== Quarterfinals ===
This round was entered by the teams placed first to fourth after 10 rounds played in 2013–14 Primera Divisió. The first legs will be played on 9 February 2014, while the second legs took place on 16 February 2014.

Team 1	Agg.	Team 2	1st leg	2nd leg
Encamp B	0–15	Lusitanos	0–11	0–4
Ordino	1–5	UE Santa Coloma	0–1	1–4
UE Engordany	0–8	UE Sant Julià	0–5	0–3
Encamp	1–4	FC Santa Coloma	0–1	1–3

=== Semifinals ===
The first legs will be played on 10 May 2014, while the second legs took place on 17 May 2014.

Team 1	Agg.	Team 2	1st leg	2nd leg
UE Santa Coloma	1–6	Lusitanos	0–4	1–2
FC Santa Coloma	2–5	UE Sant Julià	0–3	2–2

=== Final ===
25 May 2014
18:30

Lusitanos	1 – 2	UE Sant Julià
Zé Carlos 50'		Varela 29'; Aguilar 56'

Estadi Comunal, Andorra la Vella
