= 2016–17 Primera Divisió =

Primera Divisió
- Season: 2016–17
- Dates: 18 September 2016 – 21 May 2017
- Champions: FC Santa Coloma (11th title)
- Relegated: Ordino; Jenlai
- Champions League: FC Santa Coloma
- Europa League: Sant Julià; UE Santa Coloma
- Matches: 108
- Goals: 377 (3.49 per match)

The 2016–17 Primera Divisió or Lliga Grup Becier, was the 22nd season of top-tier football in Andorra. The season began on 18 September 2016 and concluded on 21 May 2017; this was followed by the two-legged relegation play-off on 28 and 31 May 2017. The defending champions were FC Santa Coloma, who won their tenth championship in the previous season.

== Teams ==
Locations of the 2016–17 Primera Divisió teams.

=== Clubs and locations ===
Team	Home town
Encamp	Encamp
Engordany	Escaldes-Engordany
FC Santa Coloma	Santa Coloma
Jenlai	Escaldes-Engordany
Lusitanos	Andorra la Vella
Ordino	Ordino
Sant Julià	Sant Julià de Lòria
UE Santa Coloma	Santa Coloma

== Competition format ==
The participating teams first played a round-robin schedule containing three rounds with every team playing each opponent at least once "home" and once "away" for a total of 21 matches ("home" and "away" designation is symbolic as all teams except Encamp, which has its own stadium, play at several venues). The league then split up in two groups of four teams with each of them playing teams within its group in a home-and-away cycle of matches. The top four teams competed for the championship and qualification spots for European competitions while the bottom four clubs played to avoid one direct relegation spot and one relegation play-off spot. Records earned in the regular season (first round) are carried over in full to the respective second round.

== Promotion and relegation from 2015–16 ==
Penya Encarnada d'Andorra were relegated after the previous season due to finishing in eighth place. They were replaced by Segona Divisió champions Jenlai.

Encamp, who finished last season in 7th place, were originally set to compete in a two-legged relegation play-off against Carroi, the runner-up of the 2015–16 Segona Divisió for one spot in the 2016–17 Primera Divisió. However, on 20 May 2016, after the first leg, it was announced that Encamp were awarded the tie against Carroi, therefore Encamp remained in the top flight for the 2016–17 season.

== Regular season ==
=== League table ===
Pos	Team	Pld	W	D	L	GF	GA	GD	Pts	Qualification
1	FC Santa Coloma	21	15	3	3	44	14	+30	48	Qualification for the Championship round
2	Sant Julià	21	13	5	3	49	16	+33	44 (Note: Sant Julià ahead of UE Santa Coloma on head-to-head points; UE Santa Coloma–Sant Julià 1–1, Sant Julià–UE Santa Coloma 3–1, UE Santa Coloma–Sant Julià 1–1.)	Qualification for the Championship round
3	UE Santa Coloma	21	13	5	3	54	22	+32	44	Qualification for the Championship round
4	Lusitanos	21	11	6	4	40	20	+20	39	Qualification for the Championship round
5	Engordany	21	8	6	7	35	27	+8	30	Qualification for the Relegation round
6	Encamp	21	4	3	14	18	31	−13	15	Qualification for the Relegation round
7	Ordino	21	3	3	15	24	49	−25	12	Qualification for the Relegation round
8	Jenlai (Note: Jenlai were deducted three points for failing to appear in a match against FC Santa Coloma.)	21	1	1	19	10	95	−85	1	Qualification for the Relegation round

Source: Andorran Football Federation (in Catalan), Soccerway
Rules for classification: 1) Points; 2) Head-to-head points; 3) Head-to-head goal difference; 4) Head-to-head goals scored; 5) Goal difference; 6) Goals scored.

=== Results ===
First and second round
Home \ Away	ENC	ENG	SFC	JEN	LUS	ORD	SJU	SUE
Encamp	—	1–1	0–1	1–2	1–2	1–2	1–1	1–2
Engordany	3–1	—	1–4	2–1	1–1	4–2	1–3	1–2
FC Santa Coloma	0–1	1–0	—	9–0	2–3	1–0	2–1	1–1
Jenlai	0–5	0–3	0–3 (Note: Match awarded 3–0 to FC Santa Coloma due to Jenlai failing to appear for the match. Furthermore, Jenlai were also deducted 3 points in the table.)	—	1–6	1–4	1–3	0–5
Lusitanos	1–0	1–1	1–2	2–0	—	1–0	1–1	1–2
Ordino	0–1	1–6	1–2	0–0	1–2	—	0–3	0–1
Sant Julià	1–0	1–2	1–1	9–0	2–1	7–1	—	3–1
UE Santa Coloma	2–0	2–1	1–2	7–2	1–1	5–2	1–1	—

Source: Andorran Football Federation (in Catalan)
Legend: Blue = home team win; Yellow = draw; Red = away team win.

Third round
Home \ Away	ENC	ENG	SFC	JEN	LUS	ORD	SJU	SUE
Encamp	—	0–3	—	1–0	—	2–2	—	—
Engordany	—	—	—	—	1–1	—	0–1	1–1
FC Santa Coloma	1–0	2–1	—	—	0–0	—	—	2–1
Jenlai	—	0–1	0–6	—	—	—	0–5	1–10
Lusitanos	3–1	—	—	7–0	—	2–1	—	—
Ordino	—	1–1	0–2	6–1	—	—	—	0–3
Sant Julià	1–0	—	1–0	—	0–2	3–0	—	—
UE Santa Coloma	3–0	—	—	—	2–1	—	1–1	—

Source: Andorran Football Federation (in Catalan)
Legend: Blue = home team win; Yellow = draw; Red = away team win.

== Championship and relegation round ==
Records earned in the regular season were taken over to the Championship round and relegation round.

=== Championship round ===
Pos	Team	Pld	W	D	L	GF	GA	GD	Pts	Qualification
1	FC Santa Coloma (C)	27	18	6	3	57	21	+36	60	Qualification for the Champions League first qualifying round
2	Sant Julià	27	14	8	5	55	23	+32	50	Qualification for the Europa League first qualifying round (Note: UE Santa Coloma qualified for the Europa League first qualifying round by winning the 2017 Copa Constitució.)
3	UE Santa Coloma	27	14	6	7	62	34	+28	48 (Note: UE Santa Coloma ahead of Lusitanos on head-to-head points; UE Santa Coloma–Lusitanos 1–1, Lusitanos–UE Santa Coloma 1–2, UE Santa Coloma–Lusitanos 2–1, Lusitanos–UE Santa Coloma 3–3, UE Santa Coloma–Lusitanos 2–3.)	Qualification for the Europa League first qualifying round
4	Lusitanos	27	13	9	5	49	30	+19	48	

Source: Andorran Football Federation (in Catalan), Soccerway
Rules for classification: 1) Points; 2) Head-to-head points; 3) Head-to-head goal difference; 4) Head-to-head goals scored; 5) Goal difference; 6) Goals scored.
(C) Champions
Notes:

Home \ Away	SFC	LUS	SJU	SUE
FC Santa Coloma	—	1–1	1–1	1–0
Lusitanos	1–4	—	1–0	3–3
Sant Julià	3–3	0–0	—	0–1
UE Santa Coloma	1–3	2–3	1–2	—

Source: Andorran Football Federation (in Catalan)
Legend: Blue = home team win; Yellow = draw; Red = away team win.

=== Relegation round ===
Pos	Team	Pld	W	D	L	GF	GA	GD	Pts	Relegation
5	Engordany	27	10	6	11	46	39	+7	36	
6	Encamp	27	8	3	16	45	37	+8	27 (Note: Encamp ahead of Ordino on head-to-head goal difference; Encamp–Ordino 1–2, Ordino–Encamp 0–1, Encamp–Ordino 2–2, Encamp–Ordino 3–1, Ordino–Encamp 2–1.)	
7	Ordino (R)	27	8	3	16	45	56	−11	27	Qualification for the relegation play-offs
8	Jenlai (Note: Jenlai were deducted three points for failing to appear in a match against FC Santa Coloma.) (R)	27	2	1	24	18	137	−119	4	Relegation to the Segona Divisió

Source: Andorran Football Federation (in Catalan), Soccerway
Rules for classification: 1) Points; 2) Head-to-head points; 3) Head-to-head goal difference; 4) Head-to-head goals scored; 5) Goal difference; 6) Goals scored.
(R) Relegated
Notes:

Home \ Away	ENC	ENG	JEN	ORD
Encamp	—	2–0	15–1	3–1
Engordany	2–1	—	8–2	0–3
Jenlai	0–5	2–1	—	3–10
Ordino	2–1	2–0	3–0	—

Source: Andorran Football Federation (in Catalan)
Legend: Blue = home team win; Yellow = draw; Red = away team win.

== Primera Divisió play-offs ==
The seventh-placed team (third-placed in the relegation round) of the 2016–17 Primera Divisió, Ordino, and the runners-up of the 2016–17 Segona Divisió, Penya Encarnada, played in a two-legged relegation play-off for one spot in 2017–18 Primera Divisió.

28 May 2017
16:00 CEST

Penya Encarnada	0–2	Ordino
	Report	Parra 37'; Gómez 80' (pen.)

Training Center FAF 2, Santa Coloma
Referee: Robert González

31 May 2017
21:30 CEST

Ordino	1–5	Penya Encarnada
Gómez 85'	Report	Gomes do Nascimento 2', 8'; Marinho Leite 17', 46'; Vázquez Tzintzun 30'

Training Center FAF 1, Santa Coloma
Referee: Pedro Carvalho da Costa

Penya Encarnada won 5–3 on aggregate and were promoted to the 2017–18 Primera Divisió; Ordino were relegated to the 2017–18 Segona Divisió.

== Season statistics ==
=== Regular season top goalscorers ===
Rank	Player	Club	Goals
1	(Spain) Víctor Bernat	UE Santa Coloma	17
2	(Spain) Juanfer Laín	FC Santa Coloma	11
3	(Andorra) Jordi Rubio	UE Santa Coloma	10
4	(Andorra) Gabi Riera	FC Santa Coloma	9
4	(Spain) José Villanueva	Sant Julià	9
4	(Ghana) Noah Baffoe	Sant Julià	9

=== Championship round top goalscorers ===
Rank	Player	Club	Goals
1	(Spain) Isaac Padilla	Sant Julià	5
2	(Spain) Joan Salomó	UE Santa Coloma	4
3	(Spain) Chus Sosa	FC Santa Coloma	3
3	(Spain) Andreu Ramos	FC Santa Coloma	3
5	(Spain) Iban Parra	FC Santa Coloma	2
5	(Andorra) Cristopher Pousa	Lusitanos	2
5	(Paraguay) Eugenio Peralta	Lusitanos	2
5	(Spain) Juanfer Laín	FC Santa Coloma	2

=== Relegation round top goalscorers ===
Rank	Player	Club	Goals
1	(Spain) Álex Bahamonde	Ordino	7
2	(Uruguay) Sebas Varela	Encamp	6
3	(Andorra) Rodrigo Guida	Engordany	4
3	(Mexico) Diego Nájera	Encamp	4
5	(France) Julien Benhaim	Engordany	3
5	(Andorra) Joan Toscano	Ordino	3
5	(Andorra) Miguel Ángel García	Jenlai	3
5	(Paraguay) Críspulo Peña	Engordany	3
5	(Argentina) Walter Gómez	Ordino	3
