= 2018 Copa Constitució =

Tournament details
- Country: Andorra
- Teams: 12

Final positions
- Champions: FC Santa Coloma
- Runners-up: Sant Julià

Tournament statistics
- Matches played: 11
- Goals scored: 40 (3.64 per match)

The 2018 Copa Constitució was the 26th version of the national football knockout tournament involving clubs from Andorra. The cup began on 21 January 2018 and ended on 20 May 2018 with the final. The winners of the cup earned a place in the 2018–19 Europa League and would have joined the competition in the preliminary round.

UE Santa Coloma were the defending champions having won the cup in the previous season by defeating FC Santa Coloma in the final by a score of 1–0.

== Format ==
The 2018 Copa Constitució was contested by twelve clubs.

== Schedule ==
Round	Date(s)	Number of fixtures	Clubs
First round	21 January 2018	4	12 → 8
Quarter-finals	14 March 2018	4	8 → 4
Semi-finals	4 April 2018	2	4 → 2
Final	20 May 2018	1	2 → 1

== First round ==
Eight clubs competed in the first round. The matches were played on 21 January 2018.

Team 1	Score	Team 2
UE Santa Coloma	9–0	FS La Massana
Penya Encarnada	1–1 (a.e.t.) (3–1 p)	Ordino
Encamp	6–3	CE Carroi
Inter Club d'Escaldes	2–0	Atlètic Club d'Escaldes

== Quarter-finals ==
Eight clubs competed in the quarter-finals. The matches were played on 14 March 2018.

Team 1	Score	Team 2
UE Santa Coloma	1–2	Lusitanos
Penya Encarnada	0–3	FC Santa Coloma
Encamp	0–1	Sant Julià
Inter Club d'Escaldes	2–2 (8–7 p)	Engordany

== Semifinals ==
Four clubs competed in the semifinals. The matches were played on 4 April 2018.

Team 1	Score	Team 2
Lusitanos	1–2	FC Santa Coloma
Inter Club d'Escaldes	0–1	Sant Julià

== Final ==
The cup final was played on 20 May 2018.

20 May 2018
17:00

FC Santa Coloma	2–1	Sant Julià

Estadi Nacional, Andorra la Vella
Referee: Manuel Nogueira Fernandes (Andorra)

== See also ==
- 2017–18 Primera Divisió
- 2017–18 Segona Divisió
