= 2013 Copa Constitució =

Tournament details
- Country: Andorra
- Teams: 20

Final positions
- Champions: UE Santa Coloma
- Runners-up: UE Sant Julià

Tournament statistics
- Matches played: 25
- Goals scored: 123 (4.92 per match)

The 2013 Copa Constitució was the 21st season of Andorra's football knockout tournament. The competition began on 13 January 2013 with the matches of the first elimination round and ended on 26 May 2013 with the final. FC Santa Coloma are the defending champions. The winners will earn a place in the first qualifying round of the 2013–14 UEFA Europa League.

== Results ==
=== Preliminary round ===
This round was entered by the bottom eight from the twelve 2012–13 Segona Divisió teams at the time of the mid-season break: UE Extremenya, Atlètic Club d'Escaldes, FC Santa Coloma B, Principat B, FC Rànger's, FC Encamp B, FS La Massana and Penya Encarnada d'Andorra. The matches were played on 13 January 2013.

Team 1	Score	Team 2
FC Rànger's	9–0	Penya Encarnada d'Andorra
FC Encamp B	5–4	Principat B
FS La Massana	3–3 (a.e.t.) (3–1 p)	UE Extremenya
Atlètic Club d'Escaldes	3–2	FC Santa Coloma B

=== First elimination round ===
This round was entered by the top four from the twelve 2012–13 Segona Divisió teams at the time of the mid-season break: FC Ordino, UE Santa Coloma B, Casa Estrella del Benfica and Lusitanos B and will join the winners of the preliminary elimination round. The matches were played on 27 January 2013.

Team 1	Score	Team 2
FC Rànger's	2–1	FC Lusitanos B
FC Encamp B	4–1	CE Benfica
FS La Massana	2–5	UE Santa Coloma B
Atlètic Club d'Escaldes	3–5 (a.e.t.)	FC Ordino

=== Second elimination round ===
The teams from 2011–12 Primera Divisió placed fifth to eighth after 10 rounds played – CE Principat, UE Engordany, FC Encamp and Inter Club d'Escaldes – entered in this round and joined the winners of the first elimination round. For each match, one Segona Divisió and one Primera Divisió team have been drawn together. The matches were played on 24 February 2013.

Team 1	Score	Team 2
FC Rànger's	0–7	CE Principat
FC Encamp B	0–4	FC Encamp
UE Santa Coloma B	0–6	UE Engordany
FC Ordino	2–0	Inter Club d'Escaldes

=== Third elimination round ===
The winners from the previous round will compete in this round together with the teams from Primera Divisió placed first to fourth after 10 rounds played – FC Lusitanos, UE Sant Julià, FC Santa Coloma and UE Santa Coloma. The first legs will be played on 28 April 2013, while the second legs took place on 5 May 2013.

Team 1	Agg.	Team 2	1st leg	2nd leg
CE Principat	1–8	UE Santa Coloma	0–1	1–7
FC Encamp	1–3	FC Santa Coloma	1–0	0–3
UE Engordany	0–19	UE Sant Julià	0–7	0–12
FC Ordino	1–5	FC Lusitanos	0–2	1–3

=== Semi-finals ===
The first legs will be played on 12 May 2013 while the second legs will be played on 19 May 2013.

Team 1	Agg.	Team 2	1st leg	2nd leg
UE Santa Coloma	6–0	FC Santa Coloma	3–0	3–0
UE Sant Julià	2–1	FC Lusitanos	0–0	2–1

=== Final ===
26 May 2013
17:00

UE Santa Coloma	3 – 2 (a.e.t.)	UE Sant Julià
Rubio 24', 89'; Luis Miguel 94'		Fabio Serra 6'; Manuel Veiga 26'

Estadi Comunal d'Aixovall, Aixovall
Referee: Rui Miguel Maciel De Queiros
