= 2014–15 Segona Divisió =

Segona Divisió
- Season: 2014–15
- Matches: 55
- Goals: 291 (5.29 per match)
- Top goalscorer: João Lima (24 goals)
- Biggest home win: Penya Encarnada d'Andorra 12–0 Jenlai (14 February 2015)
- Biggest away win: Engordany B 0–14 UE Santa Coloma B (9 November 2014)
- Highest scoring: Engordany B 0–14 UE Santa Coloma B (9 November 2014)
- All statistics correct as of 15 February 2015.

The 2014–15 Segona Divisió was the 16th season of second-tier football in Andorra.

== Regular stage ==
=== League table ===
Pos	Team	Pld	W	D	L	GF	GA	GD	Pts	Qualification
1	Penya Encarnada d'Andorra	10	8	2	0	52	16	+36	26	Advance to play-off round
2	FC Rànger's	10	8	1	1	28	11	+17	25	Advance to play-off round
3	Atlètic Club d'Escaldes	10	5	3	2	33	16	+17	18	Advance to play-off round
4	FC Lusitanos B	10	5	2	3	30	28	+2	17	
5	UE Santa Coloma B	10	4	3	3	38	23	+15	15	
6	FS La Massana	10	4	3	3	33	20	+13	15	Advance to play-off round
7	FC Ordino B	10	4	1	5	25	26	−1	13	
8	UE Extremenya	10	3	3	4	15	18	−3	12	
9	FC Encamp B	10	2	3	5	17	25	−8	9	
10	UE Engordany B	10	1	0	9	11	59	−48	3	
11	CE Jenlai	10	0	1	9	4	44	−40	1	
12	CE Principat	0	0	0	0	0	0	0	0	
13	FC Santa Coloma B	0	0	0	0	0	0	0	0	
14	UE Sant Julià B	0	0	0	0	0	0	0	0	

Source: Segona Divisió
Rules for classification: 1st points; 2nd head-to-head points; 3rd head-to-head goal difference; 4th head-to-head goals scored; 5th goal difference; 6th goals scored

=== Results ===
Home \ Away	ACE	ENC	ENG	EXT	SFC	JEN	MAS	LUS	ORD	PEA	PRI	RAN	SJU	SUE
Atlètic Club d'Escaldes		2–2						7–0				4–2		
FC Encamp B				2–4		4–0	1–1			0–8				
Engordany	0–7	1–6		0–4		3–1			4–6					0–14
UE Extremenya	2–2					3–1	1–1			0–2				0–2
FC Santa Coloma B														
Jenlai	0–3							2–3	0–5			0–1		0–0
FS La Massana	1–2		3–0			10–0			5–0	2–4		1–4		5–4
FC Lusitanos B		3–0	6–1	1–1			4–4			2–5				
FC Ordino B		3–1		2–0				1–4				2–3		
Penya Encarnada	5–3		8–2			12–0			4–3			0–0		4–4
CE Principat														
FC Rànger's		2–0	4–0	5–0				3–2						
UE Sant Julià B														
UE Santa Coloma B	3–2	1–1						4–5	4–2			2–4		

Source: Segona Divisió (in Catalan)
Legend: Blue = home team win; Yellow = draw; Red = away team win.

== Promotion play–offs ==
At the conclusion of the regular season, four teams advanced to the promotion play-offs. Each team's regular season record was carried over to the play-off. Teams played each other twice.

Pos	Team	Pld	W	D	L	GF	GA	GD	Pts	Promotion or qualification
1	Penya Encarnada d'Andorra (C, P)	16	13	2	1	70	23	+47	41	Promotion to Primera Divisió
2	Atlètic Club d'Escaldes	16	10	3	3	59	22	+37	33	Qualification to Primera Divisió play-off
3	FC Rànger's	16	8	2	6	33	29	+4	26	
4	FS La Massana	16	5	4	7	41	44	−3	19	

Source: Segona Divisió
Rules for classification: 1st points; 2nd head-to-head points; 3rd head-to-head goal difference; 4th head-to-head goals scored; 5th goal difference; 6th goals scored
(C) Champions; (P) Promoted

=== Play-off results ===
Home \ Away	ACE	MAS	PEA	RAN
Atlètic Club d'Escaldes		7–2	2–3	3–0
FS La Massana	0–4		0–5	5–3
Penya Encarnada	1–5	5–0		3–1
FC Rànger's	0–5	1–1	0–1	

Source: Segona Divisió (in Catalan)
Legend: Blue = home team win; Yellow = draw; Red = away team win.

== Top scorers ==
As of 26 April 2015

Position	Player	Club	Goals
1	João Lima	Penya Encarnada d'Andorra	24
2	Alexandre Martínez Palau	UE Santa Coloma B	17
3	Leandro Fernandes	Atlètic Club d'Escaldes	15
4	Iván Fernández	FS La Massana	14
5-6	Manuel López	UE Santa Coloma B	12
5-6	Victor Celiz	Atlètic Club d'Escaldes	12
