= 2011 Copa Constitució =

Tournament details
- Country: Andorra

Final positions
- Champions: UE Sant Julià
- Runners-up: UE Santa Coloma

The 2011 Copa Constitució was the nineteenth season of Andorra's football knockout tournament. The competition will begin on 16 January 2011 with the matches of the first elimination round and ended on 22 May 2011 with the Final. UE Sant Julià were the defending champions. The winners will earn a place in the second qualifying round of the 2011–12 UEFA Europa League.

== Results ==
=== First elimination round ===
This round will be entered by the top eight from the ten 2010–11 Segona Divisió teams at the time of the mid-season break: Lusitanos B, FC Rànger's, FC Santa Coloma B, UE Engordany, UE Extremenya, Atlètic Club d'Escaldes, Penya Encarnada d'Andorra, and Principat B. The matches will be played on January 16, 2011.

Team 1	Score	Team 2
FC Santa Coloma B	2–4	UE Extremenya
Principat B	2–3	Atlètic Club d'Escaldes
UE Engordany	4–3	Lusitanos B
FC Rànger's	4–1	Penya Encarnada d'Andorra

=== Second elimination round ===
The teams from 2010–11 Primera Divisió placed fifth to eighth after 12 rounds played – CE Principat, Inter Club d'Escaldes, Casa Estrella del Benfica, and FC Encamp – enter in this round and will join the winners of the first elimination round. For each match, one Segona Divisió and one Primera Divisió team have been drawn together. The matches will be played on January 23, 2011.

Team 1	Score	Team 2
UE Extremenya	1–2	Casa Estrella del Benfica
Atlètic Club d'Escaldes	1–6	Inter Club d'Escaldes
UE Engordany	1–6	FC Encamp
FC Rànger's	3–1	Principat

=== Third elimination round ===
The winners from the previous round will compete in this round together with the teams from Primera Divisió placed first to fourth after 12 rounds played – Lusitanos, UE Sant Julià, FC Santa Coloma, and UE Santa Coloma. The first legs will be played on April 17, 2011 while the second legs took place on April 23, 2011.

Team 1	Agg.	Team 2	1st leg	2nd leg
Casa Estrella del Benfica	0–11	UE Santa Coloma	0–7	0–4
Inter Club d'Escaldes	1–8	Lusitanos	0–6	1–2
FC Encamp	0–19	FC Santa Coloma	0–9	0–10
FC Rànger's	1–11	UE Sant Julià	0–3	1–8

=== Semifinals ===
The first legs will be played on May 8th 2011 while the second legs took place on May 15, 2011.

Team 1	Agg.	Team 2	1st leg	2nd leg
UE Santa Coloma	4–2	Lusitanos	2–1	2–1
FC Santa Coloma	5–5; 1–4 (pens)	UE Sant Julià	2–3	3–2 (a.e.t.)

=== Final ===
8 May 2011

UE Santa Coloma	1 - 3	UE Sant Julià

Estadi Comunal d'Aixovall, Aixovall
