= 2013–14 Segona Divisió =

Segona Divisió
- Season: 2013–14
- Champions: UE Engordany
- Matches: 117
- Goals: 559 (4.78 per match)
- Top goalscorer: German Damia Fernandez - 19
- Biggest home win: UE Santa Coloma B 11-0 Penya Encarnada d'Andorra (6 October 2013)
- Biggest away win: Penya Encarnada d'Andorra 1–14 CE Jenlai (13 October 2013)
- Highest scoring: Penya Encarnada d'Andorra 1–14 CE Jenlai (13 October 2013)

The 2013–14 Segona Divisió is the 15th season of second-tier football in Andorra.

== Regular stage ==
=== League table ===
Pos	Team	Pld	W	D	L	GF	GA	GD	Pts	Qualification
1	Engordany	14	13	0	1	51	13	+38	39	Advance to play-off round
2	Jenlai	14	11	0	3	64	34	+30	33	Advance to play-off round
3	UE Santa Coloma B	14	9	0	5	51	20	+31	27	
4	FC Rànger's	14	9	0	5	50	24	+26	27	Advance to play-off round
5	FC Lusitanos B	14	8	3	3	30	22	+8	27	
6	UE Extremenya	14	8	0	6	45	23	+22	24	Advance to play-off round
7	FC Ordino B (Note: FC Ordino B were deducted 3 points.)	14	8	3	3	33	21	+12	24	
8	FC Encamp B	14	7	2	5	33	21	+12	23	
9	FC Santa Coloma B	14	5	1	8	39	41	−2	16	
10	FS La Massana	14	5	1	8	22	40	−18	16	
11	UE Sant Julià B	14	5	0	9	16	35	−19	15	
12	Atlètic Club d'Escaldes	14	3	1	10	25	48	−23	10	
13	CE Principat B	14	2	3	9	13	50	−37	9	
14	Penya Encarnada	14	1	1	12	13	74	−61	4	
15	CE Benfica (Note: Casa Estrella del Benfica were deducted 9 points.)	14	3	1	10	22	41	−19	1	

Source: Segona Divisió
Rules for classification: 1) points; 2) goal difference; 3) number of goals scored.

=== Results ===
Home \ Away	ACE	CEB	ENC	ENG	EXT	JEN	LUS	MAS	ORD	PEA	PRI	RAN	SFC	SUE	SJU
Atlètic Club d'Escaldes		2–3							1–3		1–1	2–4	5–7	4–3	0–2
CE Benfica					3–1		1–1		0–6	6–1	0–2	0–3		0–3	
FC Encamp B	0–1	4–2							1–1			0–2	2–0	2–5	3–0
Engordany	5–0	5–1	3–1					6–1					4–1	1–0	5–1
UE Extremenya	5–2		4–1	1–3		3–5	1–2	7–0		6–1					
Jenlai	6–1	5–2	0–2	2–6				1–6					6–2		3–0
FC Lusitanos B	4–3		2–2	0–1		1–5		3–1					2–1		3–1
FS La Massana	4–1	2–1	0–5									0–2	1–5	0–5	2–0
FC Ordino B				0–2	2–1	3–4	3–2	1–0		1–1	3–0				
Penya Encarnada	1–2		1–6	1–6		1–14	0–4	2–4							0–1
CE Principat B			0–4	0–2	0–3	2–5	2–2	1–1		4–2					
FC Rànger's				1–3	2–0	4–6	1–2		2–3	8–0	9–1				
FC Santa Coloma B		3–1			1–3				4–4	1–2	8–0	3–6		1–4	
UE Santa Coloma B					1–4	1–2	0–2		0–3	11–0	6–0	4–2			
UE Sant Julià B		3–2			0–6				3–0		4–0	0–4	1–2	0–5	

Source: Segona Divisió
Legend: Blue = home team win; Yellow = draw; Red = away team win.

== Promotion play-offs ==
=== League table ===
Pos	Team	Pld	W	D	L	GF	GA	GD	Pts	Promotion or qualification
1	Engordany (C, P)	20	17	1	2	73	21	+52	52	Promotion to Primera Divisió
2	Jenlai	20	13	2	5	75	46	+29	41	Qualification to Primera Divisió play-off
3	FC Rànger's	20	11	1	8	61	40	+21	34	
4	UE Extremenya	20	9	2	9	53	39	+14	29	

Source: Segona Divisió Promotion play-offs
Rules for classification: 1) points; 2) goal difference; 3) number of goals scored.
(C) Champions; (P) Promoted

=== Results ===
Home \ Away	ENG	EXT	JEN	RAN
Engordany		1–1	1–2	4–0
UE Extremenya	2–5		1–1	3–5
Jenlai	2–5	4–0		0–3
FC Rànger's	1–6	0–1	2–2	

Source: Segona Divisió Promotion play-offs
Legend: Blue = home team win; Yellow = draw; Red = away team win.

== Topscorers ==
Player	Team	Goals (penalty)	Matches
(Spain) German Damia Fernandez	CE Jenlai	19 (2)	8
(Andorra) Rachid Agharbi	UE Extremenya	19 (1)	20
(Argentina) Jorge Luis Varela	Ranger's FC	14	16
(Andorra) Manuel Vicente Lopez Vila	UE Santa Coloma B	13 (1)	12
(Andorra) Ivan Garcia Perez	Ranger's FC	13 (1)	18

== Relegation play-offs ==
The seventh-placed club in the Primera Divisió competed in a two-legged relegation playoff against the runners-up of the Promotion play-offs, for one spot in 2014–15 Primera Divisió.
