= 2017–18 Segona Divisió =

Segona Divisió
- Season: 2017–18
- Champions: Ordino
- Promoted: Ordino
- Matches: 100
- Goals: 475 (4.75 per match)
- All statistics correct as of 13 May 2018.

The 2017–18 Segona Divisió, also known as the Lliga Biosphere, was the 19th season of second-tier football in Andorra. This season began on 23 September 2017 and ended on 13 May 2018.

Inter Club d'Escaldes won the league in the previous season and were promoted along with second-placed Penya Encarnada to the 2017–18 Primera Divisió.

== Format ==
Ten clubs competed for the league title. The clubs played each other twice for a total of 18 matches for each club. The three "B" teams could not be promoted. Five clubs then advanced to a play-off to determine which club would be promoted.

== League table ==
Pos	Team	Pld	W	D	L	GF	GA	GD	Pts	Qualification
1	Ordino	18	14	1	3	80	18	+62	43	Advance to play-off round
2	Atlètic Club d'Escaldes	18	14	1	3	56	18	+38	43	Advance to play-off round
3	Carroi	18	12	2	4	65	23	+42	38	Advance to play-off round
4	La Massana	18	11	2	5	60	34	+26	35	Advance to play-off round
5	UE Santa Coloma B	18	7	3	8	30	31	−1	24	
6	Encamp B	18	6	3	9	38	52	−14	21	
7	Jenlai (Note: Jenlai were deducted 6 points.)	18	7	1	10	43	64	−21	16	Advance to play-off round
8	Ràngers	18	4	1	13	23	77	−54	13	
9	Lusitanos B (Note: Lusitanos B were deducted 6 points.)	18	2	1	15	22	71	−49	1	
10	Atlètic Amèrica (Note: Atlètic Amèrica were deducted 3 points.)	18	5	1	12	19	48	−29	13	Club retired

Source: FAF
Rules for classification: 1) points; 2) head-to-head points; 3) head-to-head goal difference; 4) head-to-head goals scored; 5) goal difference; 6) goals scored

== Results ==
Home \ Away	ATL	ACE	CAR	ENC	JEN	MAS	LUS	ORD	RAN	SUE
Atlètic Amèrica	—	0–3	0–3	0–3	3–1	2–3	2–1	0–3	3–2	4–0
Atlètic Club d'Escaldes	4–1	—	3–2	4–0	4–1	1–3	5–0	1–0	4–0	0–2
Carroi	2–2	0–0	—	9–1	1–2	2–3	9–0	2–6	2–0	1–0
Encamp B	1–2	2–3	1–4	—	6–4	1–1	3–2	2–3	3–0	0–0
Jenlai	3–0	0–3	1–3	0–5	—	3–2	7–1	0–9	1–4	2–2
La Massana	3–0	1–4	3–4	7–0	12–3	—	1–0	2–3	4–1	3–1
Lusitanos B	3–0	1–9	0–7	2–4	3–4	3–3	—	0–3	1–3	0–4
Ordino	8–0	4–0	1–2	3–1	2–3	4–1	4–2	—	11–1	6–0
Rànger's	3–0	0–4	0–11	4–4	0–7	1–6	1–2	0–9	—	2–5
UE Santa Coloma B	3–0	1–4	0–1	4–1	4–2	1–2	2–1	1–1	0–1	—

Source: FAF
Legend: Blue = home team win; Yellow = draw; Red = away team win.
For upcoming matches, an "a" indicates there is an article about the rivalry between the two participants.

== Play–off round ==
Pos	Team	Pld	W	D	L	GF	GA	GD	Pts	Promotion or qualification
1	Ordino (C, P)	22	17	2	3	97	20	+77	53	Promotion to Primera Divisió
2	Atlètic Club d'Escaldes	22	15	2	5	59	23	+36	47	Qualification to play-offs
3	Carroi	22	13	3	6	72	35	+37	42	
4	La Massana	22	13	3	6	70	40	+30	42	
5	Jenlai (Note: Jenlai were deducted 6 points.)	22	8	1	13	45	78	−33	19	

Source: FAF
Rules for classification: 1) points; 2) head-to-head points; 3) head-to-head goal difference; 4) head-to-head goals scored; 5) goal difference; 6) goals scored
(C) Champions; (P) Promoted

=== Results ===
Home \ Away	ACE	CAR	JEN	MAS	ORD
Atlètic Club d'Escaldes	—	1–0	0–1		
Carroi		—		1–1	0–9
Jenlai		1–6	—		0–3
La Massana	3–1		5–0	—	
Ordino	1–1			4–1	—

Legend: Blue = home team win; Yellow = draw; Red = away team win.
For upcoming matches, an "a" indicates there is an article about the rivalry between the two participants.

== See also ==
- 2017–18 Primera Divisió
- 2018 Copa Constitució
