= 2012–13 Segona Divisió =

Segona Divisió
- Season: 2012–13
- Champions: FC Ordino
- Promoted: FC Ordino
- Matches: 132
- Goals: 601 (4.55 per match)
- Biggest home win: FC Ordino 12–0 Penya Encarnada d'Andorra (10 November 2012)
- Biggest away win: Penya Encarnada d'Andorra 1–12 FC Ordino (7 April 2013)
- Highest scoring: Penya Encarnada d'Andorra 1–12 FC Ordino (7 April 2013)

The 2012–13 Segona Divisió was the 14th season of second-tier football in Andorra.

== Regular stage ==
=== League table ===
Pos	Team	Pld	W	D	L	GF	GA	GD	Pts	Promotion or qualification
1	Ordino (C, P)	22	22	0	0	119	10	+109	66	Promotion to Primera Divisió
2	FC Lusitanos B	22	14	2	6	60	32	+28	44	
3	FC Santa Coloma B	22	13	2	7	48	39	+9	41	
4	Atlètic Club d'Escaldes	22	11	5	6	53	40	+13	38	Qualification to Primera Divisió play-offs
5	CE Benfica	22	11	0	11	43	42	+1	33	
6	CE Principat B	22	9	5	8	53	57	−4	32	
7	UE Santa Coloma B	22	10	2	10	42	46	−4	32	
8	UE Extremenya	22	9	2	11	41	33	+8	29	
9	FC Rànger's	22	9	1	12	57	72	−15	28	
10	FC Encamp B	22	5	2	15	38	60	−22	17	
11	Penya Encarnada	22	5	0	17	30	103	−73	15	
12	FS La Massana	22	3	1	18	16	66	−50	10	

Source: Segona Divisió
Rules for classification: 1) points; 2) goal difference; 3) number of goals scored.
(C) Champions; (P) Promoted

=== Results ===
Home \ Away	ACE	CEB	ENC	EXT	LUS	MAS	ORD	PEA	PRI	RAN	SFC	SUE
Atlètic Club d'Escaldes		2–0	1–0	1–0	2–0	4–1	0–2	2–3	2–2	3–3	2–3	3–3
CE Benfica	2–4		2–0	1–0	0–4	2–1	0–2	4–0	3–1	3–0	1–3	0–1
FC Encamp B	1–4	2–1		0–2	0–0	0–3	0–6	4–3	2–3	4–3	1–2	0–1
UE Extremenya	0–2	5–1	3–1		1–4	0–1	0–4	4–1	2–1	2–6	0–0	1–0
FC Lusitanos B	2–2	0–2	2–0	2–0		3–0	1–7	7–2	4–0	4–2	3–2	4–0
FS La Massana	0–3	1–6	0–8	0–5	0–2		0–7	1–3	1–1	0–2	1–2	1–2
Ordino	5–0	6–0	6–0	1–0	4–1	3–0		12–0	9–1	7–0	6–1	3–1
Penya Encarnada	2–6	0–6	0–6	0–10	0–4	2–0	1–12		4–5	0–4	0–4	3–1
CE Principat B	4–3	5–3	2–2	0–0	2–1	4–0	1–4	5–1		6–4	4–2	4–4
FC Rànger's	4–3	4–3	5–3	0–4	2–3	0–3	2–6	3–2	5–4		3–1	1–8
FC Santa Coloma B	2–2	0–3	6–2	3–0	3–2	4–0	0–3	2–0	2–1	3–1		2–1
UE Santa Coloma B	1–2	0–3	5–2	4–2	1–6	3–2	0–4	1–3	2–0	3–2	3–1	

Source: Segona Divisió
Legend: Blue = home team win; Yellow = draw; Red = away team win.

== Relegation play-offs ==
The seventh-placed club in the Primera Divisió competed in a two-legged relegation playoff against the runners-up of the Segona Divisió, for one spot in 2013–14 Primera Divisió.

19 May 2013
20:00

FC Encamp	3 – 0	Atlètic Club d'Escaldes

DEVK-Arena, Sant Julià de Lòria

26 May 2013
20:00

Atlètic Club d'Escaldes	1 – 5	FC Encamp

DEVK-Arena, Sant Julià de Lòria
