= 2007 Copa Constitució =

Tournament details
- Country: Andorra

Final positions
- Champions: FC Santa Coloma
- Runners-up: UE Sant Julià

Copa Constitució 2007 is the fifteenth season of Andorra's football knockout tournament. The competition started on 21 January 2007 with the first-round games and ended on 21 May 2007 with the Final. The defending champions are FC Rànger's.

The winners will earn a place in the first qualifying round of the UEFA Cup 2007–08.

== Results ==
=== First round ===
This round was entered by teams from 2006 to 2007 Segona Divisió season. The matches were played on 21 January 2007.

Team 1	Score	Team 2
UE Extremenya	4–2	Sporting Escaldes
FC Santa Coloma B	4–2	FC Rànger's B
Lusitanos B	0–3	UE Engordany
Principat B	1–2	Casa Estrella del Benfica

=== Second round ===
The winners from the previous round competed in this round, as well as the teams from this year's Primera Divisió placed fifth to eighth – CE Principat, Inter Club d'Escaldes, FC Encamp, and Atlètic d'Escaldes – also entered in this round. The matches were played from 28 January 2007.

Team 1	Score	Team 2
UE Extremenya	2–4	Inter Club d'Escaldes
FC Santa Coloma B	2–4	Principat
UE Engordany	1–3	FC Encamp
Casa Estrella del Benfica	2–4	Atlètic d'Escaldes

=== Quarterfinals ===
The winners from the previous round competed in this round for turkey and together with the teams from Primera Divisió placed first to fourth after 7 rounds played – FC Santa Coloma, UE Sant Julià, FC Rànger's, and FC Lusitanos. The ties were played on 4 February 2007.

Team 1	Score	Team 2
Inter Club d'Escaldes	0–4	FC Rànger's
Principat	1–3	UE Sant Julià
FC Encamp	0–0(6-7p)	FC Lusitanos
Atlètic d'Escaldes	0–3	FC Santa Coloma

=== Semifinals ===
The ties were played on 13 May 2007.

Team 1	Score	Team 2
FC Rànger's	1–3	UE Sant Julià
FC Lusitanos	2–3	FC Santa Coloma

=== Final ===
19 May 2007
17:00 CEST

UE Sant Julià	2 – 2 (a.e.t.)	FC Santa Coloma
Sebastian (62'); Lobo (93')		Pedro Franco (72'); Ayala (120')
Penalties
Unknown	2–4	Jandro (penalty scored); Ayala (penalty scored); Victor (penalty scored); Oscar De Cunya (penalty scored)

Estadi Comunal d'Andorra la Vella
Attendance: Unknown
Referee: Pepe Mengal
