= 2017 Copa Constitució =

Tournament details
- Country: Andorra
- Teams: 12

Final positions
- Champions: UE Santa Coloma
- Runners-up: FC Santa Coloma

Tournament statistics
- Matches played: 11
- Goals scored: 37 (3.36 per match)

The 2017 Copa Constitució was the 25th version of the national football knockout tournament involving teams from Andorra. The cup began on 7 February 2017 and ended on 28 May 2017 with the final.

== Format ==
Similar to the previous year, the Copa Constitució was a single elimination tournament between 12 teams. There were eight teams from the Primera Divisió and four from the Segona Divisió. The winner, UE Santa Coloma, earned a place in the Europa League.

== Schedule ==
Round	Date(s)	Number of fixtures	Clubs
First round	7–15 February 2017	4	12 → 8
Quarter-finals	22 March – 2 April 2017	4	8 → 4
Semi-finals	12–13 April 2017	2	4 → 2
Final	28 May 2017	1	2 → 1

== First round ==
Eight teams competed in the first round. The matches were played on 7–15 February 2017.

Team 1	Score	Team 2
Ordino (1)	6–0	Atlètic Club d'Escaldes (2)
Encamp (1)	1–0	Penya Encarnada (2)
Engordany (1)	5–0	Inter Club d'Escaldes (2)
Jenlai (1)	1–1 (a.e.t.) (3–4 p)	CF Atlètic Amèrica (2)

== Quarter-finals ==
Eight teams competed in the quarter-finals. The matches were played on 22 March and 2 April 2017.

Team 1	Score	Team 2
Ordino (1)	3–2 (a.e.t.)	Sant Julià (1)
Encamp (1)	0–1	FC Santa Coloma (1)
Engordany (1)	0–1	UE Santa Coloma (1)
CF Atlètic Amèrica (2)	0–6	Lusitanos (1)

== Semi-finals ==
The four quarter-final winners competed in the semi-finals. The matches were played on 12–13 April 2017.

Team 1	Score	Team 2
Ordino	0–6	FC Santa Coloma
UE Santa Coloma	2–1	Lusitanos

== Final ==
The cup final was played on 28 May 2017.

28 May 2017

FC Santa Coloma	0–1	UE Santa Coloma

Estadi National, Andorra la Vella
Referee: Luis Miguel Do Nascimento Teixeira

== See also ==
- 2016–17 Primera Divisió
- 2016–17 Segona Divisió
