= 2022 Copa Constitució =

Tournament details
- Country: Andorra
- Teams: 14

Final positions
- Champions: Atlètic Club d'Escaldes
- Runners-up: La Massana

Tournament statistics
- Matches played: 13
- Goals scored: 41 (3.15 per match)

The 2022 Copa Constitució was the 30th edition of the Andorran national football knockout tournament. The opening round of this edition of the cup was played on 16 January 2022.

Sant Julià were the defending champions after winning the previous final over Atlètic Club d'Escaldes by a score of 2–1.

== Schedule ==
Round	Date(s)	Number of fixtures	Clubs
First round	16 January 2022	6	14 → 8
Quarter-finals	23 January 2022	4	8 → 4
Semi-finals	6–7 April 2022	2	4 → 2
Final	29 May 2022	1	2 → 1

== First round ==
Twelve clubs competed in the first round. The matches were played on 16 January 2022.

Team 1	Score	Team 2
UE Santa Coloma (1)	6–2	Encamp (2)
Inter Club d'Escaldes (1)	3–0	Sant Julià (1)
Ordino (1)	0–2	FC Santa Coloma (1)
CF Atlètic Amèrica (2)	0–2	Penya Encarnada d'Andorra (2)
FC Rànger's (2)	0–5	UE Engordany (1)
Carroi (1)	2–1	La Massana (2)

== Quarter–finals ==
Eight clubs competed in the quarter–finals: the six winners from the first round and two clubs receiving a bye.

Team 1	Score	Team 2
UE Extremenya (2)	1–0	Carroi (1)
Atlètic Club d'Escaldes (1)	2–0	UE Santa Coloma (1)
Inter Club d'Escaldes (1)	1–0	FC Santa Coloma (1)
Penya Encarnada d'Andorra (2)	0–3	UE Engordany (1)

== Semi–finals ==
The four quarter–final winners competed in the semi–finals.

Team 1	Score	Team 2
UE Engordany (1)	1–1 (a.e.t.) (2–4 p)	UE Extremenya (2)
Atlètic Club d'Escaldes (1)	2–2 (a.e.t.) (4–2 p)	Inter Club d'Escaldes (1)

== Final ==
The final was played between the winners of the semi-finals on 29 May 2022.

29 May 2022
17:00

Atlètic Club d'Escaldes (1)	4–1	UE Extremenya (2)
	Report

Estadi Nacional, Andorra la Vella
Referee: Rui Miguel Maciel Queiros

== See also ==
- 2021–22 Primera Divisió
- 2021–22 Segona Divisió
