= 2011–12 Segona Divisió =

Segona Divisió
- Season: 2011–12
- Matches: 53
- Goals: 238 (4.49 per match)
- Biggest home win: FC Lusitans B 8–0 Penya Encarnada d'Andorra (13 November); FC Lusitans B 8–0 CE Principat B (10 December)
- Biggest away win: Penya Encarnada d'Andorra 1–9 UE Santa Coloma B (3 December); La Massana 1–9 UE Santa Coloma B (11 December)
- Highest scoring: Penya Encarnada d'Andorra 1–9 UE Santa Coloma B (3 December); La Massana 1–9 UE Santa Coloma B (11 December); La Massana 3–7 FC Santa Coloma B (25 February)

2011–12 Segona Divisió was the 13th season of second-tier football in Andorra.

== Regular stage ==
=== League table ===
Pos	Team	Pld	W	D	L	GF	GA	GD	Pts	Promotion or qualification
1	Encamp (C, P)	18	14	0	4	57	22	+35	42	Promotion to Primera Divisió
2	UE Extremenya	18	13	2	3	62	17	+45	41	Qualification to Primera Divisió play-offs
3	FC Lusitanos B	18	12	2	4	54	18	+36	38	
4	Atlètic Club d'Escaldes	18	10	1	7	31	37	−6	31	
5	FC Santa Coloma B	18	9	3	6	63	32	+31	30	
6	UE Santa Coloma B	18	9	3	6	50	42	+8	30	
7	CE Benfica	18	8	1	9	33	48	−15	25	
8	CE Principat B	18	3	2	13	22	57	−35	11	
9	Penya Encarnada	18	2	3	13	26	62	−36	9	
10	FS La Massana	18	1	1	16	17	80	−63	4	

Source: 2a Divisió (in Catalan and English)
Rules for classification: 1) points; 2) goal difference; 3) number of goals scored.
(C) Champions; (P) Promoted

=== Results ===
Home \ Away	ACE	CEB	ENC	EXT	LUS	MAS	PEA	PRI	SFC	SUE
Atlètic Club d'Escaldes		1–3	0–3	0–6	0–2	3–0	2–0	1–1	3–2	4–3
CE Benfica	0–2		0–6	1–3	3–5	3–1	4–1	0–3	1–0	1–1
Encamp	4–0	4–0		1–2	3–4	3–1	2–1	6–0	4–2	3–0
UE Extremenya	3–0	1–2	4–0		1–3	6–0	5–0	6–0	1–3	10–0
FC Lusitanos B	0–1	3–0	1–2	0–2		5–1	8–0	8–0	1–1	2–1
FS La Massana	1–3	2–4	1–6	1–4	0–6		0–6	1–5	3–7	1–9
Penya Encarnada	2–3	2–5	1–2	1–1	0–3	1–3		2–1	2–6	1–9
CE Principat B	2–5	2–5	0–4	1–2	0–1	0–0	2–0		1–2	1–4
FC Santa Coloma B	1–3	7–0	2–3	2–3	2–2	7–1	3–3	6–1		2–0
UE Santa Coloma B	4–0	4–1	3–1	2–2	1–0	2–0	3–3	4–2	0–8	

Source: 2a Divisió (in Catalan and English)
Legend: Blue = home team win; Yellow = draw; Red = away team win.

== Relegation play-offs ==
The seventh-placed club in the league competed in a two-legged relegation playoff against the runners-up of the Segona Divisió, for one spot in 2012–13 Primera Divisió.

13 May 2012
18:00 CEST

Inter Club d'Escaldes	2–0	UE Extremenya

20 May 2012
20:00 CEST

UE Extremenya	0–1	Inter Club d'Escaldes
