= 2014–15 Primera Divisió =

Primera Divisió
- Season: 2014–15
- Champions: FC Santa Coloma
- Champions League: FC Santa Coloma
- Europa League: FC Lusitanos
- Matches: 56
- Goals: 209 (3.73 per match)
- Top goalscorer: Cristian Martínez (20 goals)
- Biggest home win: FC Santa Coloma 9–0 Engordany
- Biggest away win: Inter Club d'Escaldes 0–9 FC Santa Coloma; Engordany 0–9 FC Santa Coloma
- Highest scoring: FC Lusitanos 8–2 Engordany
- All statistics correct as of 15 February 2015.

The 2014–15 Primera Divisió was the 20th season of top-tier football in Andorra. It began on 21 September 2014, and ended in May 2015. The defending champions were FC Santa Coloma, who won their eighth championship in the previous season. FC Santa Coloma won the league again this season.

== Teams ==
=== Clubs and locations ===
Location of teams in 2014-15 Primera Divisió.

| Team | Home town |
|---|---|
| FC Encamp | Encamp |
| FC Lusitanos | Andorra la Vella |
| FC Ordino | Ordino |
| FC Santa Coloma | Santa Coloma |
| Inter Club d'Escaldes | Escaldes-Engordany |
| UE Engordany | Escaldes-Engordany |
| UE Santa Coloma | Santa Coloma |
| UE Sant Julià | Sant Julià de Lòria |

=== Personnel and sponsorship ===
| Team | Chairman | Head coach | Kitmaker | Kit sponsor |
|---|---|---|---|---|
| FC Encamp | (Andorra) Salvador Cervos Pia | (Andorra) Oscar Guerrero Sancho | Kelme | Inmobiliaria Gran Valira |
| FC Lusitanos | (Portugal) António da Silva Cerqueira | (Portugal) Vicente Marques Gonzalez | Peba | – |
| FC Ordino | (Andorra) David Urrea Ribera | (Spain) Víctor Manuel Torres Mestre | Macron/Nike | Assengurances Generals S.A / Ordino |
| FC Santa Coloma | (Andorra) Rafael Amat Escobar | (Andorra) Richard Imbernon Rios | Joma | – |
| Inter Club d'Escaldes | (Andorra) Antonio Colaço da Silva | (Andorra) Jordi Perotes Belmonte | Adidas | Construccions Modernes / Seu Sport |
| UE Engordany | (Spain) Gonzalo Donzion | (Spain) Joaquin Zurdo | Joma | – |
| UE Sant Julià | (Andorra) Albert Carnicé | (Spain) Raul Canete Lozano | Elements | Les Barques |
| UE Santa Coloma | (Andorra) Juan Antonio Antón Álvarez | (Spain) Emiliano Gonzalez Arques | Luanvi | Seguretat Sepir |

== Competition format ==
The participating teams first played a conventional round-robin schedule with every team playing each opponent once "home" and once "away" for a total of 14 games. The league was then split up in two groups of four teams with each of them playing teams within its group in a home-and-away cycle of games. The top four teams competed for the championship. The bottom four clubs played for one direct relegation spot and one relegation play-off spot. Records earned in the First Round were taken over to the respective Second Round.

== Promotion and relegation from 2013–14 ==
CE Principat were relegated after last season due to finishing in eighth place. They were replaced by Segona Divisió champions UE Engordany.

Inter Club d'Escaldes, who finished last season in 7th place, and Segona Divisió runners up CE Jenlai played a two-legged relegation play-off. Inter Club d'Escaldes won the playoff, 6–1 on aggregate, and remained in the Primera Divisió while CE Jenlai remained in the Segona Divisió.

== First round ==
| Pos | Team | Pld | W | D | L | GF | GA | GD | Pts | Qualification |
|---|---|---|---|---|---|---|---|---|---|---|
| 1 | FC Santa Coloma | 14 | 10 | 1 | 3 | 53 | 7 | +46 | 31 | Qualification to Championship round |
| 2 | FC Lusitanos | 14 | 10 | 1 | 3 | 45 | 17 | +28 | 31 | Qualification to Championship round |
| 3 | UE Santa Coloma | 14 | 9 | 2 | 3 | 23 | 8 | +15 | 29 | Qualification to Championship round |
| 4 | UE Sant Julià | 14 | 8 | 3 | 3 | 35 | 13 | +22 | 27 | Qualification to Championship round |
| 5 | FC Ordino | 14 | 6 | 2 | 6 | 22 | 22 | 0 | 20 | Qualification to Relegation round |
| 6 | FC Encamp | 14 | 4 | 1 | 9 | 13 | 28 | −15 | 13 | Qualification to Relegation round |
| 7 | UE Engordany | 14 | 2 | 1 | 11 | 11 | 62 | −51 | 7 | Qualification to Relegation round |
| 8 | Inter Club d'Escaldes | 14 | 1 | 1 | 12 | 7 | 52 | −45 | 4 | Qualification to Relegation round |

Source: uefa.com
Rules for classification: 1) points; 2) head-to-head points; 3) head-to-head goal difference; 4) head-to-head goals scored; 5) goal difference; 6) goals scored

| Home \ Away | ENC | ENG | INT | LUS | ORD | SJU | SFC | SUE |
|---|---|---|---|---|---|---|---|---|
| Encamp | | 2–3 | 3–1 | 0–6 | 1–0 | 0–1 | 0–3 | 1–0 |
| Engordany | 0–3 | | 3–2 | 0–5 | 1–3 | 0–5 | 0–9 | 0–2 |
| Inter Club d'Escaldes | 1–1 | 2–0 | | 0–4 | 0–2 | 0–3 | 0–9 | 0–3 |
| Lusitanos | 2–0 | 8–2 | 3–0 | | 7–1 | 3–2 | 2–1 | 1–2 |
| Ordino | 4–1 | 2–2 | 3–1 | 1–2 | | 1–2 | 0–3 | 0–1 |
| Sant Julià | 4–1 | 6–0 | 8–0 | 0–0 | 0–3 | | 2–2 | 1–1 |
| FC Santa Coloma | 1–0 | 9–0 | 7–0 | 5–1 | 0–1 | 2–0 | | 2–0 |
| UE Santa Coloma | 2–0 | 4–0 | 3–0 | 3–1 | 1–1 | 0–1 | 1–0 | |

Source: uefa.com
Legend: Blue = home team win; Yellow = draw; Red = away team win.

== Second round ==
Records earned in the First Round were taken over to the respective Second Round.

=== Championship round ===
| Pos | Team | Pld | W | D | L | GF | GA | GD | Pts | Qualification |
|---|---|---|---|---|---|---|---|---|---|---|
| 1 | FC Santa Coloma (C) | 20 | 13 | 3 | 4 | 64 | 14 | +50 | 42 | Qualification to Champions League first qualifying round |
| 2 | FC Lusitanos | 20 | 12 | 3 | 5 | 53 | 26 | +27 | 39 (Note: FC Lusitanos were deducted 1 point due illegal lineup in match against UE Santa Coloma, compensated with 2 points.) | Qualification to Europa League first qualifying round |
| 3 | UE Santa Coloma | 20 | 12 | 2 | 6 | 33 | 17 | +16 | 38 | |
| 4 | UE Sant Julià | 20 | 9 | 5 | 6 | 41 | 23 | +18 | 32 | Qualification to Europa League first qualifying round (Note: UE Sant Julià qualified for the Europa League first qualifying round by winning the 2015 Copa Constitució.) |

Source: faf.ad
Rules for classification: 1) points; 2) head-to-head points; 3) head-to-head goal difference; 4) head-to-head goals scored; 5) goal difference; 6) goals scored
(C) Champions
Notes:

| Home \ Away | LUS | SJU | SFC | SUE |
|---|---|---|---|---|
| Lusitanos | | 1–1 | 1–2 | 0–3 |
| Sant Julià | 0–1 | | 2–2 | 1–3 |
| FC Santa Coloma | 1–1 | 3–1 | | 3–1 |
| UE Santa Coloma | 2–4 | 0–1 | 1–0 | |

Source: Soccerway
Legend: Blue = home team win; Yellow = draw; Red = away team win.

=== Relegation round ===
| Pos | Team | Pld | W | D | L | GF | GA | GD | Pts | Qualification or relegation |
|---|---|---|---|---|---|---|---|---|---|---|
| 1 | FC Ordino | 20 | 10 | 3 | 7 | 36 | 29 | +7 | 33 | |
| 2 | FC Encamp | 20 | 7 | 3 | 10 | 21 | 34 | −13 | 24 (Note: UE Engordany were deducted 3 points due illegal lineup in match against FC Encamp, compensated with 3 points.) | |
| 3 | UE Engordany (O) | 20 | 5 | 2 | 13 | 21 | 72 | −51 | 17 | Qualification to Primera Divisió play-off |
| 4 | Inter Club d'Escaldes (R) | 20 | 1 | 1 | 18 | 9 | 63 | −54 | 4 | Relegation to Segona Divisió |

Source: faf.ad
Rules for classification: 1) points; 2) head-to-head points; 3) head-to-head goal difference; 4) head-to-head goals scored; 5) goal difference; 6) goals scored
(O) Play-off winners; (R) Relegated
Notes:

| Home \ Away | ENC | ENG | INT | ORD |
|---|---|---|---|---|
| Encamp | | 1–1 | 2–1 | 1–1 |
| Engordany | 0–3 | | 3–0 | 2–5 |
| Inter Club d'Escaldes | 0–1 | 0–1 | | 1–2 |
| Ordino | 3–0 | 1–3 | 2–0 | |

Source: Soccerway
Legend: Blue = home team win; Yellow = draw; Red = away team win.

== Primera Divisió play-off ==
The seventh-placed/3rd-placed club (UE Engordany) from the relegation round competed in a two-legged relegation play-off against the runner-up of the 2014–15 Segona Divisió (Atlètic Club d'Escaldes), for one spot in 2015-16 Primera Divisió.

20 May 2015
21:30

| UE Engordany | 2–1 | Atlètic Club d'Escaldes |
|---|---|---|
| Carlos Medina Somoza 69'; Cedric D'Almeida 85' | | Victor Emmanuel Celiz Tevez 20' |

DEVK-Arena, Sant Julià de Lòria

24 May 2015
12:00

| Atlètic Club d'Escaldes | 1–2 | UE Engordany |
|---|---|---|
| Victor Emmanuel Celiz Tevez 35' |

DEVK-Arena, Sant Julià de Lòria

UE Engordany won 4–2 on aggregate and will compete in the 2015–16 Primera Divisió

== Top scorers ==
As of 15 February 2015

| Position | Player | Club | Goals |
|---|---|---|---|
| 1 | Cristian Martínez | FC Santa Coloma | 20 |
| 2 | José Aguilar | Lusitanos | 10 |
| 3 | Bruninho | Lusitanos | 8 |
| 4 | Gabi Riera | FC Santa Coloma | 7 |
| 5 | Luís Miguel dos Reis | Lusitanos | 6 |
| 5 | Manuel Morlán | Sant Julià | 6 |
| 5 | Sebastián Varela | Sant Julià | 6 |
| 8 | Víctor Bernat | UE Santa Coloma | 5 |
| 8 | Juanfer Laín | FC Santa Coloma | 5 |
| 8 | Victor Rodríguez | UE Santa Coloma | 5 |
