= 2016–17 Segona Divisió =

Segona Divisió
- Season: 2016–17
- Champions: Inter Club d'Escaldes
- Promoted: Inter Club d'Escaldes; Penya Encarnada
- Matches: 104
- Goals: 502 (4.83 per match)
- All statistics correct as of 21 May 2017.

The 2016–17 Segona Divisió, also known as the Lliga Biosphere, was the 18th season of second-tier football in Andorra. This season began on 25 September 2016 and ended on 21 May 2017.

== Format ==
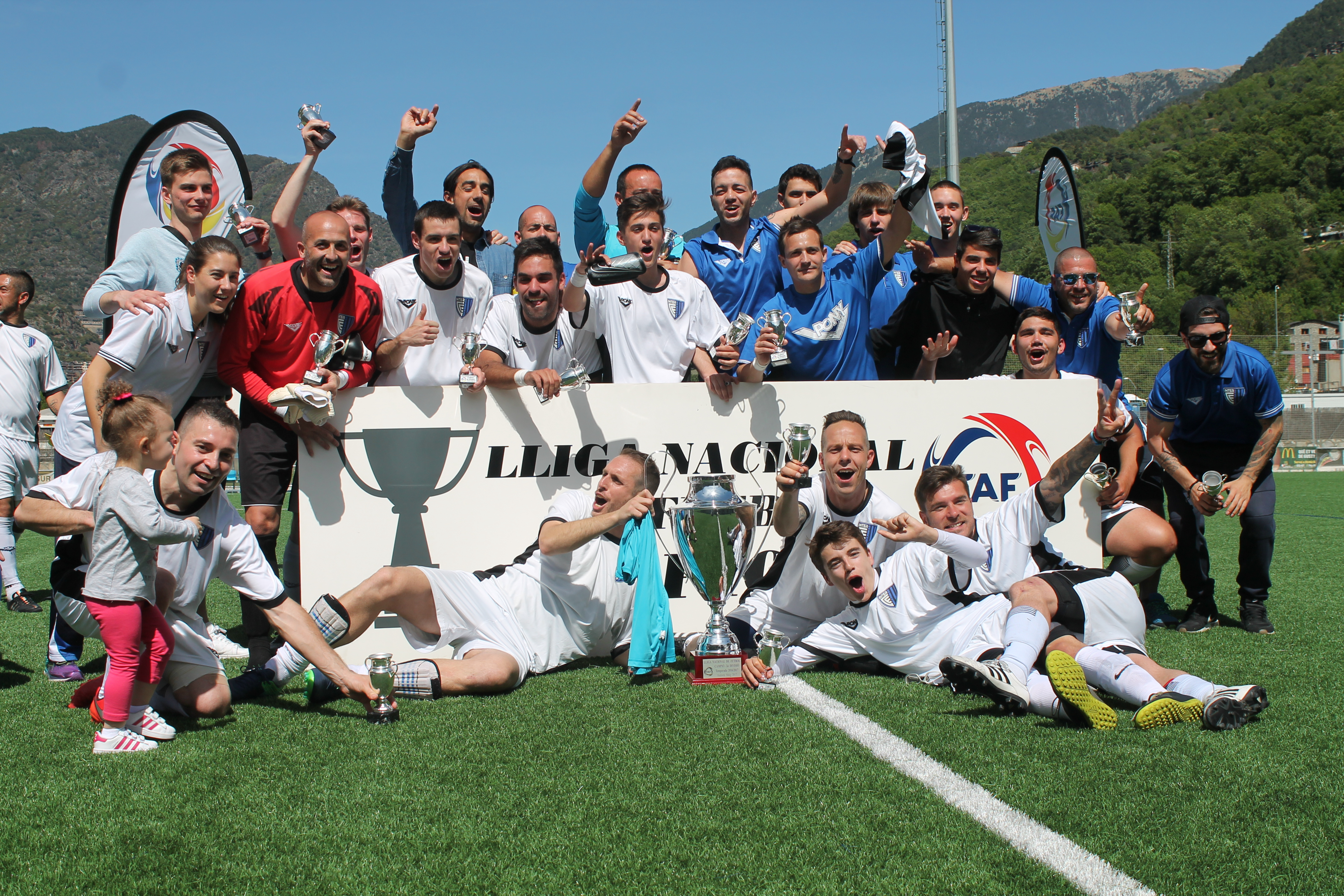
Inter

For this season, the league was contested between ten clubs. The clubs played each other twice totaling 18 matches each. The leaders at this point were to be promoted to the Primera Divisió next season with the second placed club to participate in a play-off match for a place in next season's Primera Divisió. The four "B" teams cannot be promoted. After the regular season a play-off round between the non-B clubs began. Each club will play the others once with the regular season records being carried over.

== League table ==
Pos	Team	Pld	W	D	L	GF	GA	GD	Pts	Promotion or qualification
1	Inter Club d'Escaldes	18	14	1	3	54	12	+42	43	Advance to play-off round
2	Penya Encarnada	18	13	3	2	66	24	+42	42	Advance to play-off round
3	CF Atlètic Amèrica	18	11	4	3	43	22	+21	37	Advance to play-off round
4	FC Encamp B	18	10	2	6	43	35	+8	32	
5	Atlètic Club d'Escaldes	18	8	3	7	55	31	+24	27	Advance to play-off round
6	FC Santa Coloma B	18	7	2	9	28	39	−11	23	
7	FS La Massana	18	6	3	9	41	43	−2	21	Advance to play-off round
8	UE Santa Coloma B	18	6	1	11	28	47	−19	19	
9	FC Rànger's	18	3	1	14	17	57	−40	10	Advance to play-off round
10	FC Lusitanos B	18	2	0	16	21	86	−65	6	

Source: FAF soccerway.com
Rules for classification: 1) points; 2) head-to-head points; 3) head-to-head goal difference; 4) head-to-head goals scored; 5) goal difference; 6) goals scored

== Results ==
Home \ Away	ATL	ACE	ENC	SFC	INT	MAS	LUS	PEA	RAN	SUE
Atlètic Amèrica		3–3	0–1	3–1	1–1	4–1	2–0	1–5	5–0	1–0
Atlètic Club d'Escaldes	0–1		7–1	2–2	0–3	6–0	5–3	1–1	6–0	2–3
FC Encamp B	2–1	3–2		3–2	0–4	3–3	6–1	1–3	3–1	4–0
FC Santa Coloma B	0–1	0–3	2–2		1–3	2–1	3–2	1–6	1–4	1–0
Inter Club d'Escaldes	1–2	3–0	3–1	1–0		3–0	7–0	4–0	1–0	6–0
FS La Massana	1–3	1–5	1–5	3–0	3–2		4–1	2–2	1–1	0–2
FC Lusitanos B	1–9	1–4	1–6	0–4	0–6	1–6		0–10	2–3	2–1
Penya Encarnada	2–2	2–0	2–0	1–2	4–3	3–2	4–1		8–0	7–2
FC Rànger's	1–2	0–7	2–1	2–3	0–2	0–3	1–3	1–3		0–3
UE Santa Coloma B	2–2	4–2	0–1	2–3	0–1	0–9	5–2	1–3	3–1	

Source: soccerway.com
Legend: Blue = home team win; Yellow = draw; Red = away team win.

== Play–off round ==
Pos	Team	Pld	W	D	L	GF	GA	GD	Pts	Promotion or qualification
1	Inter Club d'Escaldes (C, P)	23	18	2	3	82	16	+66	56	Promotion to Primera Divisió
2	Penya Encarnada (P)	23	17	4	2	89	27	+62	55	Qualification to play-offs
3	CF Atlètic Amèrica	23	13	4	6	57	42	+15	43	
4	Atlètic Club d'Escaldes	23	11	3	9	81	41	+40	36	
5	FS La Massana	23	7	3	13	49	69	−20	24	
6	FC Rànger's	23	3	1	19	22	100	−78	10	

Rules for classification: 1) points; 2) head-to-head points; 3) head-to-head goal difference; 4) head-to-head goals scored; 5) goal difference; 6) goals scored
(C) Champions; (P) Promoted

=== Play–off results ===
Home \ Away	ATL	ACE	INT	MAS	PEA	RAN
Atlètic Amèrica		3–4			1–5	
Atlètic Club d'Escaldes			0–3	11–0	1–3	
Inter Club d'Escaldes	7–0				1–1	13–3
FS La Massana	3–5		0–4			5–0
Penya Encarnada				6–0		10–0
FC Rànger's	1–5	1–10				

Legend: Blue = home team win; Yellow = draw; Red = away team win.

== See also ==
- 2016–17 Primera Divisió
- 2017 Copa Constitució
