= 2008–09 Segona Divisió =

Segona Divisió
- Season: 2008–09
- Champions: FC Encamp

Segona Divisió 2008–09 was the 10th season of football of Segona Divisió, in Andorra.

== Regular stage ==
=== League table ===
Pos	Team	Pld	W	D	L	GF	GA	GD	Pts	Qualification
1	Encamp	12	8	4	0	44	14	+30	28	Advance to play-off round
2	FC Lusitanos B	12	7	2	3	35	18	+17	23	Advance to play-off round
3	Atlètic Club d'Escaldes	12	7	2	3	33	21	+12	23	Advance to play-off round
4	UE Extremenya	12	5	3	4	31	22	+9	18	Advance to play-off round
5	Casa del Benfica	12	4	3	5	30	23	+7	15	
6	CE Principat B	11	2	1	8	11	34	−23	7	
7	Jenlai	11	0	1	10	11	63	−52	1	

Source: GSA
Rules for classification: 1) points; 2) goal difference; 3) number of goals scored.

}}

- Round 1

[Sep 20] Jenlai 3–5 Atlètic [Sep 21] Lusitans B 4–1 Principat B Encamp 0–0 Benfica Extremenya bye

- Round 2

[Sep 27] Extremenya 4–0 Jenlai [Sep 28] Benfica 2–3 Lusitans B [Sep 29] Atlètic awd Principat B [awarded 3–0, originally 3–4] Encamp bye

- Round 3

[Oct 4] Jenlai 2–5 Benfica [Oct 5] Extremenya 1–3 Encamp [Oct 6] Lusitans B 1–2 Atlètic Principat B bye

- Round 4

[Oct 11] Encamp 5–0 Jenlai [Oct 12] Benfica 0–5 Atlètic Principat B 1–1 Extremenya Lusitans B bye

- Round 5

[Oct 19] Extremenya 1–6 Lusitans B Atlètic 3–4 Encamp [Oct 20] Jenlai 1–3 Principat B Benfica bye

- Round 6

[Oct 25] Extremenya 3–0 Benfica Encamp 3–0 Principat B [Oct 26] Lusitans B 0–0 Jenlai Atlètic bye

- Round 7

[Nov 8] Atlètic 1–1 Extremenya [Nov 9] Encamp 2–1 Lusitans B Principat B 3–0 Benfica Jenlai bye

- Round 8

[Nov 22] Benfica 2–2 Encamp [Nov 23] Atlètic 6–3 Jenlai [Nov 24] Principat B 0–2 Lusitans B Extremenya bye

- Round 9

[Dec 13] Principat B 0–3 Atlètic [Mar 21] Lusitans B 4–3 Benfica Jenlai 1–10 Extremenya Encamp bye

- Round 10

[Jan 25] Encamp 3–1 Extremenya Atlètic 3–1 Lusitans B [Feb 8] Benfica 7–0 Jenlai Principat B bye

- Round 11

[Feb 21] Atlètic 0–5 Benfica Jenlai 1–11 Encamp [Feb 22] Extremenya 4–1 Principat B Lusitans B bye

- Round 12

[Feb 28] Lusitans B 4–2 Extremenya [Mar 1] Encamp 1–1 Atlètic Principat B n/p Jenlai Benfica bye

- Round 13

[Mar 7] Jenlai 0–7 Lusitans B [Mar 8] Principat B 2–8 Encamp Benfica 1–1 Extremenya Atlètic bye

- Round 14

[Mar 15] Lusitans B 2–2 Encamp Benfica 5–0 Principat B [Mar 16] Extremenya 2–1 Atlètic Jenlai bye

== Promotion playoff ==
=== Final table ===
Pos	Team	Pld	W	D	L	GF	GA	GD	Pts	Promotion or qualification
1	FC Encamp (C, P)	18	11	4	3	53	23	+30	37	Promotion to Primera Divisió
2	Atlètic Club d'Escaldes	18	10	4	4	40	26	+14	34	Qualification to Primera Divisió play-offs
3	Lusitanos B	18	8	4	6	40	26	+14	28	
4	UE Extremenya	18	6	7	5	40	30	+10	25	

Source: GSA
(C) Champions; (P) Promoted
- Round 1

[Mar 28] Atlètic 3–2 Encamp [Mar 29] Lusitans B 2–2 Extremenya

- Round 2 [Apr 5]

Encamp 1–3 Extremenya Atlètic 0–1 Lusitans B

- Round 3 [Apr 19]

Encamp 2–0 Lusitans B Extremenya 0–0 Atlètic

- Round 4

[Apr 25] Extremenya 1–1 Lusitans B [Apr 26] Encamp 0–1 Atlètic

- Round 17 [May 3]

Lusitans B 0–1 Atlètic Extremenya 1–2 Encamp

- Round 18 [May 10]

Lusitans B 1–2 Encamp Atlètic 2–2 Extremenya

== Promotion and relegation playoff ==
Inter Club d'Escaldes competed in a two-legged relegation play-off against Atlètic Club d'Escaldes, runners-up from Segona Divisió, for one spot in 2009–10 Primera Divisió. Inter successfully retained their Primera Divisió spot after winning on penalties 10–9.

17 May 2009
20:00 CEST

Inter Club d'Escaldes	2–1	Atlètic Club d'Escaldes

Estadi Comunal d'Aixovall, Aixovall

24 May 2009
18:00 CEST

Atlètic Club d'Escaldes	2–1	Inter Club d'Escaldes
Penalties
	9–10

Estadi Comunal d'Aixovall, Aixovall
