= 2015–16 Segona Divisió =

Segona Divisió
- Season: 2015–16

The 2015–16 Segona Divisió, or Lliga Biosphere, is the 17th season of second-tier football in Andorra. The season began on 13 September 2015 and will end on 8 May 2016.

== Personnel and sponsorship ==
Team	Chairman	Head coach	Kitmaker	Kit sponsor
Atlètic Club d'Escaldes		Luis Carlos Gonçalves Ventura	Joma	M-Perruquers
CE Carroi	Miquel Àngel Garcia Val	(Andorra) Xavier Canal Boga	Pentex	Nova Constructora Grup
CE Jenlai	(Andorra) Juan Alberto Párraga Colmenero	(Peru) Hugo Gregorio Roldán Surichaqui	Joma/Kelme	ReformArt
CF Atlètic Amèrica	(Peru) Lorenzo Castillo Silva	(Peru) Teodoro Julio Olortegui Guerrero	Kelme	
FC Encamp B	Lluís Goñi Espinal	Albert Jansà Girona	Kelme	Inmobiliaria Gran Valira
FC Lusitanos B	(Portugal) Antonio Da Silva Cerqueira	(Portugal) Jorge Diogo Marques Festa Simoes	Peba/Armatura	Les Barques
FC Ordino B	(Andorra) David Urrea Ribera	-	Macron/Nike	Assengurances Generals S.A / Ordino
FC Santa Coloma B	Xavier Torne de Celis	(Andorra) Albert Ribera Contreras	Joma	Don Denis
FS La Massana	(Andorra) Sergio Canicoba Abollo	(Spain) Luis Blanco Torrado	Joma	
FC Pas de la Casa		(Portugal) José António Combra Araújo	Luanvi	
Inter Club d'Escaldes	(Portugal) Antonio Colaço Da Silva	(Andorra) Alexandre Somoza Lozada	Pony	
FC Rànger's	Héctor Varela Castro	Héctor Varela Castro	Joma	
UE Extremenya	Alfonso Martin	(Spain) Carlos Sanchez Estella	Joma	
UE Santa Coloma B	(Andorra) Joan Antoni Antón Álvarez	(Spain) Lluis Miquel Aloy Tarrason	Luanvi	Seguretat Sepir

== Format ==
This season, the league will consist of fourteen teams. Teams will play each other twice for a total of 26 matches each. The league champion will be promoted to next season's Primera Divisió. The second placed team will play a play-off match for a spot in next season's Primera Divisió. The five "B" teams can not be promoted.

== League table ==
Pos	Team	Pld	W	D	L	GF	GA	GD	Pts	Promotion or qualification
1	CE Jenlai (C, P)	23	21	1	1	111	15	+96	64	Promotion to Primera Divisió
2	CE Carroi	23	19	1	3	73	23	+50	58	Qualification to play-offs
3	Atlètic Club d'Escaldes	23	18	2	3	59	13	+46	56	
4	UE Extremenya	23	17	1	5	85	26	+59	52	
5	Inter Club d'Escaldes	23	13	4	6	71	28	+43	43	
6	FC Encamp B	23	9	5	9	44	42	+2	32	
7	CF Atlètic Amèrica	23	8	2	13	52	57	−5	26	
8	FS La Massana	23	7	3	13	48	58	−10	24	
9	FC Santa Coloma B	23	6	4	13	44	58	−14	22	
10	UE Santa Coloma B	23	6	4	13	40	74	−34	22	
11	FC Rànger's	23	4	0	19	35	98	−63	12	
12	FC Lusitanos B	23	0	0	23	10	129	−119	0	
13	FC Ordino B (E)	12	2	1	9	14	65	−51	7	Withdrawn from competition
14	FC Pas de la Casa (E)	0	0	0	0	0	0	0	0	Withdrawn from competition

Source: FAF soccerway.com
Rules for classification: 1) points; 2) head-to-head points; 3) head-to-head goal difference; 4) head-to-head goals scored; 5) goal difference; 6) goals scored
(C) Champions; (E) Eliminated; (P) Promoted

== Results ==
Home \ Away	ATL	ACE	CAR	ENC	EXT	SFC	INT	JEN	MAS	LUS	ORD	PAS	RAN	SUE
Atlètic Amèrica		0–3	0–3	0–0	1–5	1–1	1–2	0–2	4–2	10–0			5–2	4–0
Atlètic Club d'Escaldes	2–0		2–5	0–0	1–0	5–0	1–1	1–0	3–1	3–0	6–1		4–0	2–1
CE Carroi	3–1	1–0		3–1	3–1	4–3	1–0	1–2	3–1	8–0			6–2	3–0
FC Encamp B	2–1	1–2	2–2		1–2	8–3	1–1	1–6	1–1	2–1	3–0		4–0	6–0
UE Extremenya	7–0	0–1	2–1	3–1		4–0	3–3	2–3	4–3	11–0	7–2		10–0	4–2
FC Santa Coloma B	3–1	0–1	1–2	1–2	0–1		2–4	0–8	3–0	9–0			3–1	2–2
Inter Club d'Escaldes	4–1	0–1	2–3	3–1	0–2	3–0		0–3	3–0	5–0	15–0		3–0	6–0
CE Jenlai	10–0	2–1	2–0	4–1	2–1	3–1	4–2		2–1	5–1			8–0	8–0
FS La Massana	3–2	0–5	0–5	3–0	0–2	2–2	1–3	1–4		9–2	3–0		4–0	2–2
FC Lusitanos B	1–2	0–4	1–2	0–2	0–5	1–2	0–7	0–14	0–3		0–4		1–5	0–2
FC Ordino B	1–10		0–7			1–1		0–5					4–3	1–5
FC Pas de la Casa														
FC Rànger's	0–3	0–4	0–1	1–2	1–6	4–3	2–3	0–13	5–4	7–1				0–3
UE Santa Coloma B	1–5	0–7	0–6	5–2	1–3	0–4	1–1	1–1	3–4	8–1			3–2	

Updated to match(es) played on 12 May 2016. Source: soccerway.com
Legend: Blue = home team win; Yellow = draw; Red = away team win.

== Topscorers ==
Place	Best scorers	Team	Goals
1	(Andorra) Diego Rafael Marinho Leite	CE Jenlai	41 (5)
2	(Andorra) Manuel Vicente Lopez Vila	UE Extremenya	33 (1)
3	(Cameroon) Zacharie Moussa Ngbeweng	Atlètic Club d'Escaldes	18 (4)
4	(Spain) Carles Valls Balletbo	CE Jenlai	18 (1)
5	(Mexico) Cesar Daniel Gonzalez Guevara	CE Carroi	16
