= 2008 Copa Constitució =

Tournament details
- Country: Andorra

Final positions
- Champions: UE Sant Julià
- Runners-up: Lusitanos

The Copa Constitució 2008 was the 16th edition of the Andorran Cup, which is a football knockout competition.

== Qualifying match ==
The match was played on 17 January 2008.

Team 1	Score	Team 2
Inter Club d'Escaldes B	2-3	Sporting Club d'Escaldes

== First elimination round ==
The matches were played on 19 and 20 January 2008.

Team 1	Score	Team 2
FC Encamp	lost to	UE Santa Coloma
Lusitanos B	lost to	UE Extremenya
Atlètic Club d'Escaldes	beat	CE Principat B

Played on 21 January 2008:

Team 1	Score	Team 2
FC Rànger's B	beat	Sporting Club d'Escaldes

== Second elimination round ==
The matches were played on 27 January 2008.

Team 1	Score	Team 2
FC Rànger's B	1-5	CE Principat
UE Extremenya	7-1	Casa Estrella del Benfica
Atlètic Club d'Escaldes	0-3	Inter Club d'Escaldes
UE Santa Coloma	1-2	UE Engordany

== Quarter finals ==
The matches were played on 6 and 10 February 2008.

Team 1	Score	Team 2
CE Principat	lost to	FC Santa Coloma
Inter Club d'Escaldes	1-2	FC Rànger's
UE Extremenya	0-6	UE Sant Julià
UE Engordany	0-1	Lusitanos

== Semi finals ==
The matches were played on 18 May 2008.

Team 1	Score	Team 2
UE Sant Julià	6-1	FC Rànger's
Lusitanos	1-1 (4-3 ps.)	FC Santa Coloma

== Final ==
The final was played on 24 May 2008.

Team 1	Score	Team 2
UE Sant Julià	6-1	Lusitanos
