= 2016 Copa Constitució =

Tournament details
- Country: Andorra
- Teams: 12

Final positions
- Champions: UE Santa Coloma
- Runners-up: Engordany

Tournament statistics
- Matches played: 11
- Goals scored: 43 (3.91 per match)

The 2016 Copa Constitució is the 24th edition of the national football knockout tournament in Andorra. The tournament began on 21 February 2016 and ended on 15 May 2016 with the final.

== Format ==
This year's version of the Copa Constitució was a single elimination tournament contested by 12 teams. Eight teams from the Primera Divisió and four from the Segona Divisió competed. The winner, UE Santa Coloma, earned a spot in the Europa League.

== Schedule ==
Round	Date(s)	Number of fixtures	Clubs
First round	21 February 2016	4	12 → 8
Quarter-finals	28 February 2016	4	8 → 4
Semi-finals	6 March 2016	2	4 → 2
Final	15 May 2016	1	2 → 1

== First round ==
Eight teams competed in the first round. Matches were played 21 February 2016.

Team 1	Score	Team 2
Ordino	5–3 (a.e.t.)	Jenlai
Penya Encarnada	7–0	Atlètic Club d'Escaldes
Inter Club d'Escaldes	0–3 (a.e.t.)	Encamp
Extremenya	0–5	Engordany

== Quarter-finals ==
Eight teams competed in the quarter-finals. Matches were played 28 February 2016.

Team 1	Score	Team 2
FC Santa Coloma	2–0	Ordino
Penya Encarnada	1–3	UE Santa Coloma
Sant Julià	1–0	Encamp
Lusitanos	2–4	Engordany

== Semi-finals ==
Four teams competed in the quarter-finals. Matches were played 6 March 2016.

Team 1	Score	Team 2
FC Santa Coloma	0–1	UE Santa Coloma
Sant Julià	1–2	Engordany

== Final ==
The final was played on 15 May 2016 at Estadi Comunal d'Andorra la Vella, Andorra la Vella.

15 May 2016
17:00

UE Santa Coloma	3–0	Engordany

Estadi Comunal d'Andorra la Vella, Andorra la Vella

== See also ==
2015–16 Primera Divisió
