= 2021–22 Segona Divisió =

2021-22 Andorran Segona Divisió season

Segona Divisió
- Season: 2021–22
- Champions: Penya Encarnada
- Promoted: Penya Encarnada
- Matches: 122
- Goals: 573 (4.7 per match)
- Biggest home win: Penya Encarnada 12–0 Atlètic Club d'Escaldes (19 March 2022)
- Biggest away win: Engordany B 1–14 La Massana (7 November 2021)
- Highest scoring: Engordany B 1–14 La Massana (7 November 2021)
- Longest winning run: 7 matches La Massana (26 February 2022-9 April 2022)
- Longest unbeaten run: 22 matches Penya Encarnada (19 September 2021-24 April 2022)
- Longest winless run: 16 matches Engordany B (26 September 2021-6 March 2022)
- Longest losing run: 14 matches Engordany B (26 September 2021-19 February 2022)

The 2021–22 Segona Divisió, also known as Lliga UNIDA, was the 23rd season of second-tier football in Andorra. The season began on 18 September 2021 and ended on 22 May 2022.

== Teams ==
Ordino won the league the previous season, and were promoted to the Primera Divisió. Penya Encarnada were relegated from the Primera Divisió and joined the Segona Divisió. UE Extremenya returned to the league after not participating the previous season. Jenlai withdrew from the league and all of their results were void.

== League table ==
Pos	Team	Pld	W	D	L	GF	GA	GD	Pts	Qualification
1	Penya Encarnada	20	17	3	0	106	13	+93	54	Advance to play-off round (Note: B teams can not be promoted to the Primera Divisió. As a result, the playoff spot was given to the 5th place team in the regular season, Atlètic Amèrica.)
2	La Massana	20	15	3	2	63	19	+44	48	Advance to play-off round
3	Extremenya	20	12	5	3	65	27	+38	41	Advance to play-off round
4	UE Santa Coloma B	20	12	2	6	58	25	+33	38	
5	Atlètic Amèrica	20	11	1	8	52	33	+19	34	Advance to play-off round
6	Encamp	20	8	4	8	36	39	−3	28	
7	Sant Julià B	20	7	0	13	34	50	−16	21	
8	Atlètic d'Escaldes B	20	6	1	13	26	62	−36	19	
9	FC Santa Coloma B	20	6	0	14	32	79	−47	18	
10	Rànger's	20	5	0	15	33	67	−34	15	
11	Engordany B	20	1	1	18	22	113	−91	4	
12	Jenlai	0	0	0	0	0	0	0	0	Withdrew

Source: FAF
Rules for classification: 1) points; 2) head-to-head points; 3) head-to-head goal difference; 4) head-to-head goals scored; 5) goal difference; 6) goals scored

== Results ==
Home \ Away	PEN	MAS	EXT	SUE	ATL	ENC	ACE	SFC	RAN	SJU	ENG	JEN
Penya Encarnada		1–1	0–0	2–1	6–1	4–1	12–0	8–0	8–0	3–0	7–1	
La Massana	0–2		0–1	4–2	3–0	1–1	3–1	2–0	5–2	3–0	3–2	
Extremenya	2–2	0–5		2–1	3–1	2–2	4–1	2–3	4–2	5–0	10–1	
UE Santa Coloma B	0–1	0–1	2–2		3–0	4–0	2–1	7–2	3–2	0–2	9–0	
Atlètic Amèrica	1–2	1–2	2–1	1–1		0–2	2–0	4–2	2–0	3–0	6–0	
Encamp	0–5	2–2	1–1	1–3	1–5		4–1	2–4	1–0	3–0	7–0	
Atlètic d'Escaldes B	0–7	1–4	0–4	0–5	1–3	0–1		5–1	2–1	1–5	2–2	
FC Santa Coloma B	1–12	2–5	0–5	0–2	0–5	0–3	1–2		1–2	3–0	3–1	
Rànger's	1–11	0–2	2–4	3–6	0–6	3–0	1–2	2–3		1–2	5–3	
Sant Julià B	3–5	0–3	0–3	0–3	5–4	4–1	0–3	8–0	0–3		5–0	
Engordany B	0–8	1–14	2–10	1–4	1–5	0–3	0–3	2–6	2–3	3–0		
Jenlai												

Source: Soccerway.com
Legend: Blue = home team win; Yellow = draw; Red = away team win.
For upcoming matches, an "a" indicates there is an article about the rivalry between the two participants.

== Play–off round ==
Pos	Team	Pld	W	D	L	GF	GA	GD	Pts	Promotion or qualification
1	Penya Encarnada (C, P)	26	21	4	1	120	21	+99	67	Promotion to Primera Divisió
2	La Massana	26	17	5	4	80	34	+46	56	Qualification to play-offs
3	Extremenya	26	14	6	6	77	43	+34	48	
4	Atlètic Amèrica	26	12	3	11	61	46	+15	39	

Source: FAF soccerway.com
Rules for classification: 1) points; 2) head-to-head points; 3) head-to-head goal difference; 4) head-to-head goals scored; 5) goal difference; 6) goals scored
(C) Champions; (P) Promoted

=== Results ===
Home \ Away	ATL	EXT	MAS	PEN
Atlètic Amèrica		0–3	3–3	1–1
Extremenya	0–3		1–5	2–3
La Massana	4–2	3–3		0–1
Penya Encarnada	2–0	2–3	5–2	

Source: soccerway.com
Legend: Blue = home team win; Yellow = draw; Red = away team win.
For upcoming matches, an "a" indicates there is an article about the rivalry between the two participants.

== Primera Divisió play-offs ==
The seventh-placed team, third-placed in the relegation round, from the Primera Divisió and the runners-up from the Segona Divisió played a play-off over two legs for a place in the 2022–23 Primera Divisió.

29 May 2022	La Massana	0–3	Engordany
20:00			Nájera 4'; Marcel 10'; Assane 78'

1 June 2022	Engordany	4–1 (7–1 agg.)	La Massana
20:30	Marcel 25', 90+2'; Minutella 27'; Mirabaje 51'		Leighton 79'

== See also ==
- 2021–22 Primera Divisió
- 2022 Copa Constitució
