= 2017–18 Primera Divisió =

Primera Divisió
- Season: 2017–18
- Dates: 17 September 2017 – 20 May 2018
- Champions: FC Santa Coloma
- Relegated: Penya Encarnada
- Champions League: FC Santa Coloma
- Europa League: Engordany
- Matches: 104
- Goals: 382 (3.67 per match)
- All statistics correct as of 13 May 2018.

The 2017–18 Primera Divisió, also known as Lliga Multisegur Assegurances, was the 23rd season of top-tier football in Andorra. The season began on 17 September 2017 and ended on 20 May 2018. The defending champions are FC Santa Coloma having won their eleventh championship the previous season.

The winner of the league this season will earn a place in the preliminary round of the 2018–19 Champions League, and the second-placed club will earn a place in the preliminary round of the 2018–19 Europa League.

== Teams ==
Inter Club d'Escaldes earned a place in the Primera Divisió this season by winning the 2016–17 Segona Divisió. Penya Encarnada will join them after defeating Ordino in a play-off.

=== Clubs and locations ===
Team	Home town
Encamp	Encamp
Engordany	Escaldes-Engordany
FC Santa Coloma	Santa Coloma
Inter Club d'Escaldes	Escaldes-Engordany
Lusitanos	Andorra la Vella
Penya Encarnada	Andorra la Vella
Sant Julià	Sant Julià de Lòria
UE Santa Coloma	Santa Coloma

== Regular season ==
=== League table ===
Pos	Team	Pld	W	D	L	GF	GA	GD	Pts	Qualification
1	FC Santa Coloma	21	15	3	3	55	16	+39	48	Qualification for the Championship round
2	Engordany	21	14	5	2	45	11	+34	47	Qualification for the Championship round
3	Sant Julià	21	12	6	3	58	15	+43	42	Qualification for the Championship round
4	Lusitanos	21	10	4	7	49	26	+23	34	Qualification for the Championship round
5	UE Santa Coloma	21	8	5	8	35	25	+10	29	Qualification for the Relegation round
6	Inter Club d'Escaldes	21	7	4	10	33	29	+4	25	Qualification for the Relegation round
7	Encamp	21	3	1	17	26	76	−50	10	Qualification for the Relegation round
8	Penya Encarnada	21	0	2	19	10	113	−103	2	Qualification for the Relegation round

Source: FAF Soccerway
Rules for classification: 1) Points; 2) Head-to-head points; 3) Head-to-head goal difference; 4) Head-to-head goals scored; 5) Goal difference; 6) Goals scored.

=== Results ===
The eight clubs will play each other three times for twenty–one matches each during the regular season.

First and second round
Home \ Away	ENC	ENG	INT	LUS	PEN	SJU	SFC	SUE
Encamp	—	0–2	1–3	0–6	6–0	0–1	1–7	3–6
Engordany	2–0	—	4–1	1–3	1–0	1–0	0–1	1–0
Inter Club d'Escaldes	4–1	1–0	—	0–2	2–0	2–4	0–2	2–2
Lusitanos	2–0	0–3	1–1	—	12–1	0–1	2–2	0–1
Penya Encarnada	2–8	0–6	0–8	2–2	—	0–4	0–6	0–4
Sant Julià	1–1	0–0	1–0	1–0	18–0	—	1–1	2–3
FC Santa Coloma	2–0	2–3	3–0	5–3	7–0	1–0	—	1–0
UE Santa Coloma	5–0	0–1	0–0	0–1	7–1	1–1	0–2	—

Source: soccerway.com
Legend: Blue = home team win; Yellow = draw; Red = away team win.

Third round
Home \ Away	ENC	ENG	INT	LUS	PEN	SJU	SFC	SUE
Encamp	—		0–2		2–1		0–5	1–2
Engordany	11–1	—	1–0	3–0				1–1
Inter Club d'Escaldes			—	1–2	3–0	1–3		
Lusitanos	3–0			—	6–1	1–1	2–0	
Penya Encarnada		0–2			—		0–3	1–1
Sant Julià	9–1	0–0			5–1	—	3–1	
FC Santa Coloma		1–1	1–0				—	2–0
UE Santa Coloma			0–2	2–1		0–2		—

Source: soccerway.com
Legend: Blue = home team win; Yellow = draw; Red = away team win.

== Championship and relegation round ==
Records earned in the regular season were taken over to the Championship round and relegation round.

=== Championship round ===
Pos	Team	Pld	W	D	L	GF	GA	GD	Pts	Qualification
1	FC Santa Coloma (C)	27	18	4	5	62	20	+42	58	Qualification for the Champions League preliminary round
2	Engordany	27	16	7	4	50	17	+33	55	Qualification for the Europa League preliminary round
3	Sant Julià	27	14	6	7	64	24	+40	48	Qualification for the Europa League preliminary round
4	Lusitanos	27	13	5	9	59	35	+24	44	

Source: Soccerway FAF
Rules for classification: 1) Points; 2) Head-to-head points; 3) Head-to-head goal difference; 4) Head-to-head goals scored; 5) Goal difference; 6) Goals scored.
(C) Champions

=== Relegation round ===
Pos	Team	Pld	W	D	L	GF	GA	GD	Pts	Relegation
5	UE Santa Coloma	27	12	5	10	53	29	+24	41	
6	Inter Club d'Escaldes	27	10	5	12	45	43	+2	35	
7	Encamp (O)	27	4	2	21	34	88	−54	14	Qualification for the relegation play-offs
8	Penya Encarnada (R)	27	3	2	22	15	126	−111	11	Relegation to the Segona Divisió

Source: Soccerway FAF
Rules for classification: 1) Points; 2) Head-to-head points; 3) Head-to-head goal difference; 4) Head-to-head goals scored; 5) Goal difference; 6) Goals scored.
(O) Play-off winners; (R) Relegated

== Primera Divisió play-offs ==
The seventh-placed club (third-placed in the relegation round), Encamp, from the 2017–18 Primera Divisió and the runners-up from the 2017–18 Segona Divisió, Atlètic Club d'Escaldes, played in a two-legged relegation play-off for one place in the 2018–19 Primera Divisió.

17 May 2018	Encamp	2–0	Atlètic Club d'Escaldes
20:30 CEST

24 May 2018	Atlètic Club d'Escaldes	0–0 (0–2 agg.)	Encamp
20:30 CEST

== Season statistics ==
=== Regular season top goalscorers ===
Rank	Player	Club	Goals
1	(Spain) Chus Sosa	FC Santa Coloma	9
1	(Andorra) Luigi San Nicolás	Engordany	9
3	(France) Vincent Ramaël	Lusitanos	8
3	(Spain) José Aguilar	Inter Club d'Escaldes	8
3	(Spain) Walter Fernández	Sant Julià	8
3	(Spain) Juanma Torres	FC Santa Coloma	8
3	(Andorra) Sebas Gómez	Engordany	8

=== Regular season top goalkeepers ===
Rank	Name	Club	Goals against	Matches	Average
1	(Spain) Jesús Coca	Engordany	11	19	0.58
2	(Argentina) Nico Ratti	Sant Julià	14	18	0.78
3	(Spain) Eloy Casals	FC Santa Coloma	13	15	0.87

=== Championship round top goalscorers ===
Rank	Player	Club	Goals
1	(Spain) Chus Sosa	FC Santa Coloma	5
1	(France) Vincent Ramaël	Lusitanos	5
3	(Spain) Joel Méndez	Sant Julià	3
4	(Uruguay) Nicolás Alonso	Engordany	2
4	(Andorra) Carlos Gomes	Lusitanos	2

=== Relegation round top goalscorers ===
Rank	Player	Club	Goals
1	(Spain) Arturo Riestra	UE Santa Coloma	4
2	(Andorra) Sergio Crespo	UE Santa Coloma	3
2	(Spain) Xavier Gallart	Inter Club d'Escaldes	3
4	(Spain) Albert Virgili	Inter Club d'Escaldes	2
4	(Colombia) Andrés Briñez	Encamp	2
4	(Spain) Óscar Reyes	Inter Club d'Escaldes	2
4	(Andorra) Enric Triquell	Penya Encarnada	2
4	(Andorra) Christopher Pousa	UE Santa Coloma	2
4	(Paraguay) Eugenio Peralta	Inter Club d'Escaldes	2
4	(Spain) Joan Salomó	UE Santa Coloma	2
4	(Andorra) Andreu Matos	Encamp	2
4	(Andorra) Jonathan Ferreira	Encamp	2
4	(Andorra) David Maneiro	UE Santa Coloma	2
