= Andreu Matos =

Andorran footballer

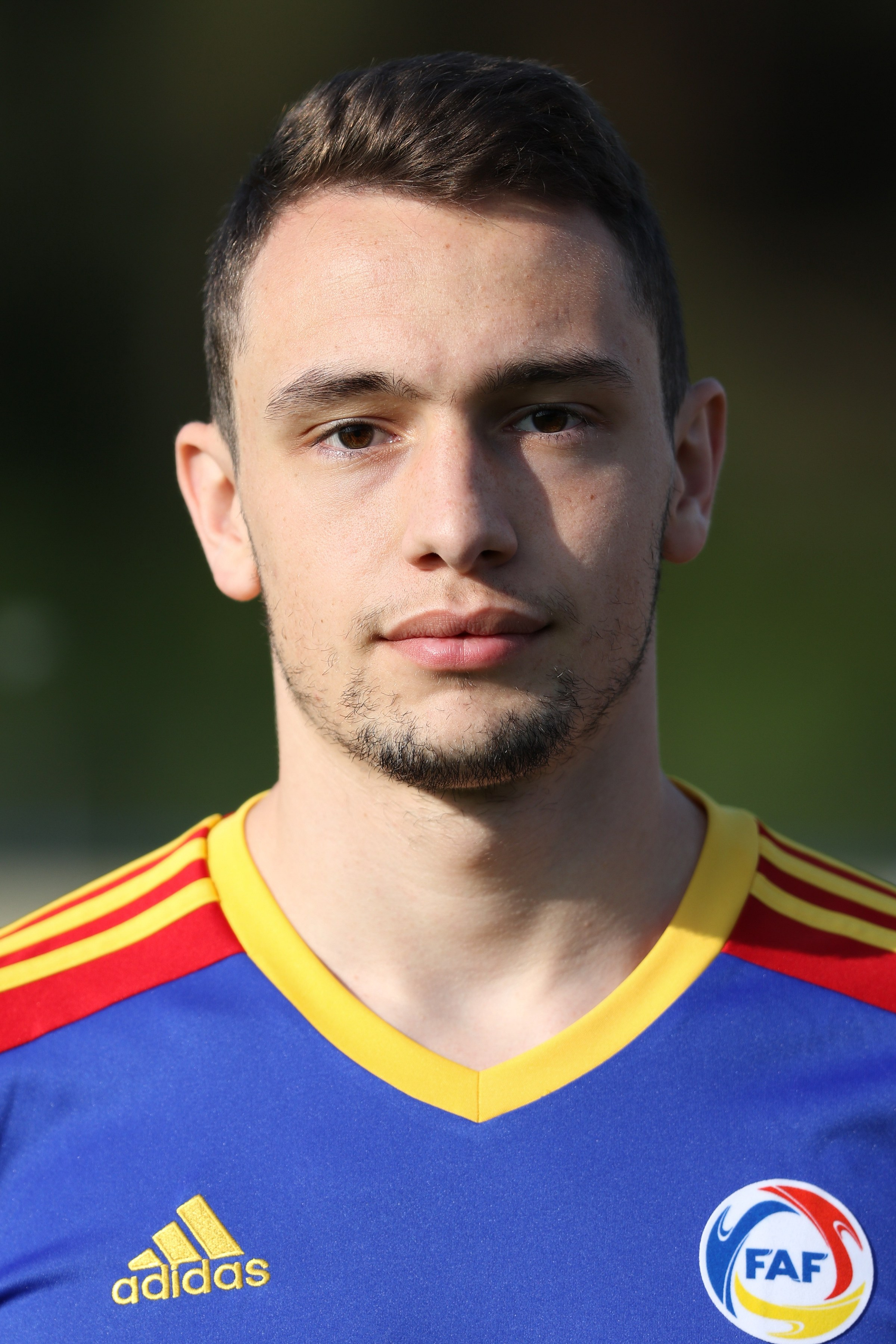
- Matos in 2016

Personal information
- Full name: Andreu Matos Muñoz
- Date of birth: 1 December 1995 (age 30)
- Place of birth: Andorra la Vella, Andorra
- Height: 1.78 m (5 ft 10 in)
- Position: Forward

Team information
- Current team: UE Santa Coloma
- Number: 20

Youth career
- –2012: FC Santa Coloma
- 2013: FC Andorra

Senior career*
Years	Team	Apps	(Gls)
2013–2014	FC Santa Coloma		
2014–2015	Inter d'Escaldes		
2015	FC Santa Coloma	2	(0)
2016	UE Engordany	2	(1)
2016–2017	FC Santa Coloma	8	(0)
2017–2019	Encamp	21	(6)
2019–	UE Santa Coloma	19	(3)

International career^{‡}
2012–2013	Andorra U19	5	(0)
2015–2016	Andorra U21	10	(0)
2016	Andorra	2	(0)
- * Club domestic league appearances and goals as of 21:25, 14 July 2020 (UTC) ‡ National team caps and goals as of 21:25, 14 July 2020 (UTC)

Andreu Matos Muñoz (born 1 December 1995) is an Andorran footballer currently playing as a forward for FC Santa Coloma of the Primera Divisió.

== Career statistics ==
=== Club ===
As of 14 July 2020.

Club	Season	League			Cup		Continental		Other		Total	
Club	Season	Division	Apps	Goals	Apps	Goals	Apps	Goals	Apps	Goals	Apps	Goals
FC Santa Coloma	2015–16	Primera Divisió	2	0	0	0	0	0	0	0	2	0
UE Engordany	2015–16	Primera Divisió	2	1	4 (Note: Appearances in the Copa Constitució)	0	–		4 (Note: Appearances in the Relegation round)	5	10	6
FC Santa Coloma	2016–17	Primera Divisió	8	0	0	0	0	0	3 (Note: Appearances in the Championship round)	1	11	1
Encamp	2017–18	Primera Divisió	11	5	0	0	–		6 (Note: Five appearances and two goals in the Relegation round, one appearance and two goals in the Primera Divisió play-offs)	4	17	9
Encamp	2018–19	Primera Divisió	10	1	1	0	–		6 (Note: Appearances in the Relegation round)	0	17	1
Encamp	Total		21	6	1	0	0	0	12	4	34	10
UE Santa Coloma	2019–20	Primera Divisió	19	3	0	0	–		0	0	19	3
Career total			52	10	5	0	0	0	19	10	76	20

=== International ===
As of match played 14 July 2020.

National team	Year	Apps	Goals
Andorra	2016	2	0
Total		2	0
