= 2007–08 Primera Divisió =

Primera Divisió
- Season: 2007–08
- Champions: FC Santa Coloma
- Relegated: Casa del Benfica
- Champions League: FC Santa Coloma
- UEFA Cup: Sant Julià
- Matches: 80
- Goals: 301 (3.76 per match)

The 2007–08 Primera Divisió season was the 13th since its establishment in 1995. The first matches of the season were played on 23 September 2007. FC Rànger's are the defending champions, having won their 2nd title the previous season.

== First round ==
Pos	Team	Pld	W	D	L	GF	GA	GD	Pts	Qualification
1	FC Santa Coloma	14	11	3	0	58	4	+54	36	Qualification to Championship round
2	Rànger's	14	10	3	1	37	16	+21	33	Qualification to Championship round
3	Sant Julià	14	9	3	2	46	11	+35	30	Qualification to Championship round
4	Lusitans	14	9	0	5	34	13	+21	27	Qualification to Championship round
5	Principat	14	5	2	7	20	33	−13	17	Qualification to Relegation round
6	Engordany	14	3	1	10	17	61	−44	10	Qualification to Relegation round
7	Inter d'Escaldes	14	2	1	11	11	32	−21	7	Qualification to Relegation round
8	Casa del Benfica	14	0	1	13	4	57	−53	1	Qualification to Relegation round

Source: RSSSF
Rules for classification: 1) points; 2) head-to-head points; 3) head-to-head goal difference; 4) goal difference; 5) number of goals scored; 6) fair-play points; 7) playoff match

Home \ Away	CEB	ENG	INT	LUS	PRI	RAN	SFC	SJU
CE Benfica		0–1	1–3	1–6	1–3	0–3	0–6	0–10
Engordany	1–1		2–1	0–5	2–4	2–3	0–11	1–4
Inter d'Escaldes	2–0	1–2		2–4	0–1	0–2	0–3	0–3
Lusitans	2–0	8–1	2–0		2–0	2–0	0–1	1–4
Principat	3–0	3–2	0–0	0–2		2–5	0–4	2–2
Rànger's	7–0	4–1	3–2	1–0	3–2		2–2	1–1
FC Santa Coloma	7–0	11–0	4–0	2–0	4–0	1–1		1–1
Sant Julià	3–0	5–2	5–0	1–0	6–0	1–2	0–1	

Source: RSSSF
Legend: Blue = home team win; Yellow = draw; Red = away team win.

== Second round ==
=== Championship Round ===
Pos	Team	Pld	W	D	L	GF	GA	GD	Pts	Qualification
1	FC Santa Coloma (C)	20	14	5	1	69	10	+59	47	Qualification to Champions League first qualifying round
2	Sant Julià	20	12	5	3	59	19	+40	41	Qualification to UEFA Cup first qualifying round
3	Rànger's	20	12	4	4	47	30	+17	40	
4	Lusitans	20	10	1	9	44	29	+15	31	

Source: RSSSF
Rules for classification: 1) points; 2) head-to-head points; 3) head-to-head goal difference; 4) goal difference; 5) number of goals scored; 6) fair-play points; 7) playoff match
(C) Champions

Home \ Away	LUS	RAN	SFC	SJU
Lusitans		2–4	1–5	1–1
Rànger's	3–2		0–1	1–4
FC Santa Coloma	1–0	2–2		1–1
Sant Julià	2–4	3–0	2–1	

Source: RSSSF
Legend: Blue = home team win; Yellow = draw; Red = away team win.

=== Relegation Round ===
Pos	Team	Pld	W	D	L	GF	GA	GD	Pts	Qualification or relegation
1	Principat	20	9	3	8	33	37	−4	30	
2	Inter d'Escaldes	20	6	2	12	23	37	−14	20	
3	Engordany (O)	20	4	1	15	21	79	−58	13	Qualification to relegation play-offs
4	Casa del Benfica (R)	20	2	1	17	13	68	−55	7	Relegation to Segona Divisió

Source: RSSSF
Rules for classification: 1) points; 2) head-to-head points; 3) head-to-head goal difference; 4) goal difference; 5) number of goals scored; 6) fair-play points; 7) playoff match
(O) Play-off winners; (R) Relegated

Home \ Away	CEB	ENG	INT	PRI
CE Benfica		1–2	1–2	3–1
Engordany	1–3		1–3	0–3
Inter d'Escaldes	2–1	4–0		0–1
Principat	3–0	4–0	1–1	

Source: RSSSF
Legend: Blue = home team win; Yellow = draw; Red = away team win.
