= 2015–16 Primera Divisió =

Primera Divisió
- Season: 2015–16
- Champions: FC Santa Coloma
- Relegated: Penya Encarnada
- Champions League: FC Santa Coloma
- Europa League: Lusitanos; UE Santa Coloma
- Matches: 80
- Goals: 262 (3.28 per match)
- Biggest home win: UE Santa Coloma 6–0 Encamp (1 November 2015); Lusitanos 6–0 Encamp (15 November 2015); FC Santa Coloma 6–0 Encamp (13 December 2015)
- Biggest away win: Encamp 0–6 Sant Julià (9 December 2015)
- Highest scoring: Penya Encarnada 3–7 Ordino (17 April 2016)

The 2015–16 Primera Divisió or Lliga Grup Becier, was the 21st season of top-tier football in Andorra. The season began on 27 September 2015. The defending champions were FC Santa Coloma, who won their ninth championship in the previous season.

== Teams ==
=== Clubs and locations ===
Location of teams in 2015-16 Primera Divisió.

Team	Home town
Encamp	Encamp
Engordany	Escaldes-Engordany
FC Santa Coloma	Santa Coloma
Lusitanos	Andorra la Vella
Ordino	Ordino
Penya Encarnada	Andorra la Vella
Sant Julià	Sant Julià de Lòria
UE Santa Coloma	Santa Coloma

=== Personnel and sponsorship ===
Team	Chairman	Head coach	Kitmaker	Kit sponsor
Encamp	(Andorra) Salvador Cervos Pia	(Andorra) Oscar Guerrero Sancho	Kelme	Inmobiliaria Gran Valira
Engordany	(Spain) Gonzalo Donzion Pichel	(Spain) Josep Mengual	Joma	La Adelita
FC Santa Coloma	(Andorra) Alain Molné Kirik	(Andorra) Richard Imbernon Rios	Joma	Don Denis
Lusitanos	(Portugal) António da Silva Cerqueira	(Spain) Raúl Cañete Lozano	Peba/Armatura	Les Barques
Ordino	(Andorra) David Urrea Ribera	(Spain) Miguel Ángel Lozano	Macron/Nike	Assengurances Generals S.A / Ordino
Penya Encarnada	(Portugal) José Manuel da Costa	(Portugal) Rubén Olivera Fidalgo	Fly Sport	Bigfoot / JG
Sant Julià	(Andorra) Albert Carnicé	(Spain) Carlos Sànchez Estella	Pentex	Tic Tapa
UE Santa Coloma	(Andorra) Joan Antoni Antón Álvarez	(Spain) Emilio Gomez Gallardo	Luanvi	Seguretat Sepir

== Competition format ==
The participating teams first play a conventional round-robin schedule with every team playing each opponent once "home" and once "away" for a total of 14 games. The league is then split up in two groups of four teams with each of them playing teams within its group in a home-and-away cycle of games. The top four teams compete for the championship. The bottom four clubs play for one direct relegation spot and one relegation play-off spot. Records earned in the first round are taken over to the respective second round.

== Promotion and relegation from 2014–15 ==
Inter Club d'Escaldes were relegated after last season due to finishing in eighth place. They were replaced by Segona Divisió champions Penya Encarnada d'Andorra.

UE Engordany, who finished last season in 7th place, and Segona Divisió runners up Atlètic Club d'Escaldes played a two-legged relegation play-off. UE Engordany won the playoff, 4–2 on aggregate, and remained in the Primera Divisió while Atlètic Club d'Escaldes remained in the Segona Divisió.

== Regular season ==
Pos	Team	Pld	W	D	L	GF	GA	GD	Pts	Qualification
1	FC Santa Coloma	14	12	1	1	41	7	+34	37	Qualification for the championship round
2	Lusitanos	14	10	0	4	28	18	+10	30	Qualification for the championship round
3	UE Santa Coloma	14	8	3	3	31	11	+20	27	Qualification for the championship round
4	Sant Julià	14	7	3	4	30	14	+16	24	Qualification for the championship round
5	Engordany	14	5	2	7	18	22	−4	17	Qualification for the relegation round
6	Encamp	14	3	2	9	15	41	−26	11	Qualification for the relegation round
7	Ordino	14	3	1	10	15	35	−20	10	Qualification for the relegation round
8	Penya Encarnada	14	1	2	11	6	36	−30	5	Qualification for the relegation round

Source: Andorran Football Federation, Soccerway
Rules for classification: 1) Points; 2) Head-to-head points; 3) Head-to-head goal difference; 4) Head-to-head goals scored; 5) Goal difference; 6) Goals scored.

Home \ Away	ENC	ENG	SFC	LUS	ORD	PEA	SJU	SUE
Encamp		2–4	1–5	2–3	3–0	1–0	0–6	1–2
Engordany	0–0		1–3	2–4	3–0	1–0	1–1	0–2
FC Santa Coloma	6–0	3–1		0–1	2–0	5–0	2–0	2–0
Lusitanos	6–0	1–0	0–4		2–1	4–0	1–3	0–2
Ordino	0–4	2–0	3–4	0–1		0–2	4–3	1–6
Penya Encarnada	1–1	0–2	0–4	0–2	0–3		2–2	0–5
Sant Julià	2–0	4–0	0–1	2–0	4–0	3–1		0–0
UE Santa Coloma	6–0	0–3	0–0	2–3	1–1	3–0	2–0	

Source: Soccerway
Legend: Blue = home team win; Yellow = draw; Red = away team win.

== Championship and relegation round ==
Records earned in the regular season are taken over to the Championship round and relegation round.

=== Championship round ===
Pos	Team	Pld	W	D	L	GF	GA	GD	Pts	Qualification
1	FC Santa Coloma (C)	20	14	5	1	44	8	+36	47	Qualification for the Champions League first qualifying round
2	Lusitanos	20	12	3	5	37	28	+9	39	Qualification for the Europa League first qualifying round
3	Sant Julià	20	9	5	6	41	20	+21	32	
4	UE Santa Coloma	20	8	6	6	34	20	+14	30	Qualification for the Europa League first qualifying round (Note: UE Santa Coloma qualified for the Europa League first qualifying round by winning the 2016 Copa Constitució.)

Source: Andorran Football Federation, Soccerway
Rules for classification: 1) Points; 2) Head-to-head points; 3) Head-to-head goal difference; 4) Head-to-head goals scored; 5) Goal difference; 6) Goals scored.
(C) Champions
Notes:

Home \ Away	LUS	SJU	SFC	SUE
Lusitanos		2–6	0–0	1–1
Sant Julià	2–3		0–0	3–0
FC Santa Coloma	0–0	1–0		1–1
UE Santa Coloma	1–3	0–0	0–1	

Source: Soccerway
Legend: Blue = home team win; Yellow = draw; Red = away team win.

=== Relegation round ===
Pos	Team	Pld	W	D	L	GF	GA	GD	Pts	Relegation
5	Engordany	20	9	2	9	37	34	+3	29	
6	Ordino	20	8	2	10	32	44	−12	26	
7	Encamp (O)	20	4	4	12	22	50	−28	16	Qualification for the relegation play-offs
8	Penya Encarnada (R)	20	1	3	16	15	58	−43	3	Relegation to the Segona Divisió

Source: Andorran Football Federation, Soccerway
Rules for classification: 1) Points; 2) Head-to-head points; 3) Head-to-head goal difference; 4) Head-to-head goals scored; 5) Goal difference; 6) Goals scored.
(O) Play-off winners; (R) Relegated

Home \ Away	ENC	ENG	ORD	PEA
Encamp		0–3	0–0	1–1
Engordany	4–3		1–2	3–1
Ordino	1–0	4–3		3–2
Penya Encarnada	0–3	2–5	3–7	

Source: Soccerway
Legend: Blue = home team win; Yellow = draw; Red = away team win.

== Primera Divisió play-offs ==
The seventh-placed team (third-placed in the relegation round), Encamp, were originally set to compete in a two-legged relegation play-off against CE Carroi, the runner-up of the 2015–16 Segona Divisió for one spot in 2016–17 Primera Divisió.

15 May 2016
12:00

CE Carroi	0–3 Awarded	Encamp
	Report

Camp d’Esports d’Aixovall, Sant Julià de Lòria

However, on 20 May 2016, it was announced that Encamp were awarded the tie against CE Carroi, therefore Encamp will remain in the top flight for next season.

~~22 May 2016~~
~~12:00~~

Encamp	v	CE Carroi

Camp de Futbol d'Encamp, Encamp
