= Tomás Lanzini =

Argentine footballer

Personal information
- Date of birth: 3 June 1991 (age 35)
- Place of birth: Ituzaingó, Argentina
- Height: 1.75 m (5 ft 9 in)
- Position: Attacking midfielder

Team information
- Current team: Linense

Youth career
- 2003–2007: River Plate
- 2008–2009: Platense

Senior career*
Years	Team	Apps	(Gls)
2009–2011	Platense	23	(5)
2011	Unión San Felipe	11	(1)
2012–2016	Ñublense	83	(20)
2016–2017	Brown de Adrogué	0	(0)
2018–2019	Encamp	16	(1)
2019–2022	Unión San Felipe	64	(4)
2022–2025	Antequera	37	(7)
2025	Juventud Torremolinos	13	(0)
2025–	Linense	1	(0)
- * Club domestic league appearances and goals as of 21 September 2025

Tomás Lanzini (Latin American Spanish: [toˈmas lanˈsini]; born 3 June 1991) is an Argentine professional footballer who plays for Spanish Tercera Federación club Linense as an attacking midfielder. His nickname is Tomy.

== Career ==
At twelve, Lanzini began his career in the youth ranks of River Plate alongside his younger brother Manuel. However, Tomás left the Núñez-based club due to indiscipline, moving to Platense where he made his debut.

After a season played in Argentina, he signed up with Chile's Unión San Felipe in 2011. He then moved to second-tier side Ñublense, where he won his first title and promotion after defeating Barnechea in a penalty shootout, being a key player that season.

In 2018, Lanzini signed for Andorran club Encamp, before returning to Unión San Felipe a year later.

In 2022, Lanzini moved to Spain, signing for Antequera. After scoring seven goals in 30 appearances in his first season, Lanzini extended his contract with the club.

== Honours ==
Ñublense

- Primera B Promotion: 2012
