= Gonzalo Ucha =

Argentine footballer

Personal information
- Full name: Gonzalo Ucha Fernández
- Date of birth: 7 February 1984 (age 42)
- Place of birth: Buenos Aires, Argentina
- Height: 1.86 m (6 ft 1 in)
- Position: Forward

Senior career*
Years	Team	Apps	(Gls)
2003–2004	Benidorm		
2005–2006	Progresul București		
2006	Ceahlăul Piatra Neamț		
2008–2009	Sportivo Italiano	2	(0)
2010	Deportivo Anzoátegui	13	(2)
2011	Cobreloa	9	(0)
2012	Savona	13	(5)
2014	Kultsu	9	(2)
2015–2016	Concepción	1	(0)
2016	Nuorese	11	(2)
2018	Coquimbo Unido	0	(0)
2019–2020	Encamp	14	(3)
2020	Colchagua		
- * Club domestic league appearances and goals as of 18:23, 7 March 2021 (UTC)

Gonzalo Ucha Fernández (born February 7, 1985) is an Argentine footballer.
