= Sebastián Gómez (Andorran footballer) =

Association football player (born 1983)

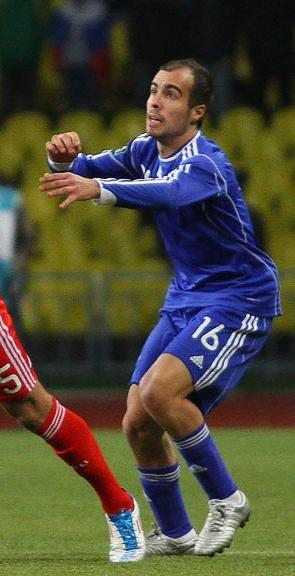
- Gómez playing for Andorra in 2011

Personal information
- Full name: Sebastián Gómez Pérez
- Date of birth: 1 November 1983 (age 42)
- Place of birth: Murcia, Spain
- Height: 1.76 m (5 ft 9 in)
- Position: Left winger

Team information
- Current team: Atlètic Amèrica
- Number: 19

Youth career
- Villa Española

Senior career*
Years	Team	Apps	(Gls)
2003–2007	FC Santa Coloma		
2007–2008	Principat		
2008–2009	Rànger's		
2009–2012	Sant Julià		
2012–2017	FC Andorra	158	(16)
2017–2023	UE Engordany	132	(24)
2023–	Atlètic Amèrica	17	(1)

International career^{‡}
2008–	Andorra	32	(0)
- * Club domestic league appearances and goals as of 29 March 2024 ‡ National team caps and goals as of 16 April 2023

Sebastián Gómez Pérez (born 1 November 1983) is a footballer who plays as a left winger for Primera Divisió club Atlètic Amèrica.

A Uruguayan national born in Spain while his father played football there, he represents Andorra at international level.

== Early life ==
Gómez was born to Uruguayan parents in Murcia, Spain in 1983. At the time, his footballer father was playing there and would move to Andorra some time later. He spent part of his childhood in Andorra and his family moved back to Uruguay when he was still very young.

== Career ==
Gómez started playing baby fútbol in Deportivo Uruguayo. He transitioned to traditional football during his youth and played for CSD Villa Española. At 18, he was relocated once again to Andorra and has played for FC Santa Coloma, Principat, Rànger's, Sant Julià, FC Andorra and UE Engordany.

== International career ==
Gómez made his international debut for Andorra in 2008.
