= Eugenio Peralta =

Paraguayan footballer (born 1977)

Personal information
- Full name: Eugenio Else Peralta Cabrera
- Date of birth: 16 December 1977 (age 48)
- Place of birth: Asunción, Paraguay
- Height: 1.90 m (6 ft 3 in)
- Position: Forward

Team information
- Current team: IC d'Escaldes
- Number: 19

Senior career*
Years	Team	Apps	(Gls)
1999–2000	Deportivo Paraguayo	29	(17)
2000–2001	All Boys	8	(9)
2002	Sud America	3	(0)
2002–2003	Argentino de Merlo	46	(16)
2004–2005	Tigre	46	(11)
2005–2007	Defensores de Belgrano	42	(14)
2007	Cienciano	13	(3)
2008	Deportivo Pereira	8	(3)
2008	Deportivo Pasto	6	(1)
2009	Deportivo Laferrere	29	(8)
2009–2010	Villa Dálmine	15	(4)
2010–2011	San Miguel	19	(1)
2011–2013	Sacachispas	66	(35)
2013–2014	Defensores Unidos	30	(13)
2014–2015	Club Luján	14	(2)
2015–2016	Ferrocarril Midland	16	(4)
2016–2017	Lusitanos	18	(8)
2017–2018	IC d'Escaldes	12	(7)
2018–2019	Encamp	22	(5)
2019–	IC d'Escaldes	5	(1)
- * Club domestic league appearances and goals as of 19:01, 17 December 2019 (UTC)

Eugenio Peralta Cabrera (born 16 December 1977) is a Paraguayan footballer who plays for Inter Club d'Escaldes in the Andorran Primera Divisió.

== Club career ==
Costa Rican side LD Alajuelense had announced the signing of Peralta on a six-month contract in January 2009, but he refused to join the club after his family expressed fears he might be injured in an earthquake. Peralta had previously experienced a deadly earthquake while he was with Cienciano in Peru during 2007.
