= CF Atlètic Amèrica =

Andorran football club

- Ground: Andorra Football Federation stadiums
- Chairman: Lluís Escandell
- Manager: Pere Puig
- League: Segona Divisió
- 2024–25: Segona Divisió, 2nd of 5
Home colours	Away colours

CF Atlètic Amèrica is an Andorran football club. The club currently plays in Primera Divisió.

== Honours ==
- Segona Divisió
  - Runners-up (2): 2022–23, 2024–25

== Current squad ==
As of 1 March 2024

Note: Flags indicate national team as defined under FIFA eligibility rules; some limited exceptions apply. Players may hold more than one non-FIFA nationality.

No.	Pos.	Nation	Player
1	GK	ESP	Teo Guillén
2	FW	UKR	Volodymyr Folvert
3	FW	ESP	Amancio Serrano
5	DF	ARG	Facundo Mayo
6	DF	ARG	Facundo Bustos
7	FW	AND	Eric Balastegui
8	MF	COL	Cristian Callejas
9	FW	IND	Kabir Nath
10	MF	COL	Andrés Briñez
11	FW	COL	Dani Rojas
13	GK	ESP	Martín Toro
17	DF	ESP	Jota
19	FW	AND	Sebastián Gómez

No.	Pos.	Nation	Player
21	DF	ARG	Martín Zuquetti
22	MF	CAN	Alex Dedame
25	GK	ARG	Julián Lorenzo
26	DF	ESP	Pedro Perez
27	FW	ARG	Thommy Bejarano
29	FW	AND	Matías Bellino
30	FW	ARG	Emanuel Balentín
32	DF	ARG	Patricio Basterrechea
33	MF	ARG	Monteros Paulino
37	FW	BRA	Uile
39	FW	AND	Marcel Ruiz
—	FW	AND	Josep Maria Tizón
—	FW	AND	Cristian Martínez
