= Andorran Football Federation =

Governing body of association football in Andorra

UEFA
- Founded: 1994; 32 years ago
- FIFA affiliation: 1996
- UEFA affiliation: 1996
- President: Felix Álvarez
- Website: www.faf.ad

The Andorran Football Federation (Catalan: Federació Andorrana de Futbol) is the governing body of football in Andorra. It was founded in 1994 and joined as a member of FIFA and UEFA in 1996. It organises the football league, Primera Divisió, the Copa Constitució and Andorran Supercup, and the Andorra national football team. It is based in Escaldes-Engordany.
