= Segona Divisió =

Association football league in Andorra

- Founded: 1999
- Country: Andorra
- Confederation: UEFA
- Number of clubs: 10
- Level on pyramid: 2
- Promotion to: Primera Divisió
- Domestic cup: Copa Constitució
- Current champions: SC Escaldes (1st title) (2025–26)
- Most championships: Encamp and Ordino (3 titles each)
- Website: Official
- Current: 2025–26 Segona Divisió

The Segona Divisió (Second Division), or Lliga Unida QP for sponsorship reasons, is the second-highest level of men's football in Andorra.

== Stadiums ==
The Andorran Football Federation organizes the matches of Primera Divisió and Segona Divisió in the stadiums owned by the local federation. Also the federation distributes the stadiums and fields for the training sessions for each team.

Stadium	Location	Capacity
Camp d'Esports d'Aixovall	Sant Julià de Lòria	1,000
Centre Esportiu d'Alàs	Alàs i Cerc (Spain)	1,500
Estadi Comunal d’Andorra la Vella	Andorra la Vella	1,300
Centre Esportiu d'Ordino	Ordino	200
Centre d'Entrenaments	Andorra la Vella	300
Camp de Futbol d'Encamp	Encamp	550

=== Location of stadiums ===
Location of the stadiums in Andorra.
Location of Centre Esportiu d'Alàs in Alàs i Cerc, Lleida (Spain).

== 2026–27 clubs ==
Team	Parish
CF Atlètic Amèrica	Escaldes-Engordany
FC City Escaldes	Andorra la Vella
FS La Massana	La Massana
Pirineus United FC	Encamp
FC Santa Coloma B	Andorra la Vella
UE Santa Coloma	Andorra la Vella
UE Sant Julià	Sant Julià de Lòria

== Previous winners ==
Season	Champions	Second place	Third place
1999–00	FC Lusitanos	Deportivo La Massana	FC Santa Coloma B
2000–01	FC Rànger's	FC Lusitanos B	FC Santa Coloma B
2001–02	Racing d'Andorra^{1}	FC Cerni	FC Santa Coloma B
2002–03	UE Engordany	Casa Estrella del Benfica	Atlètic Club d'Escaldes
2003–04	Atlètic Club d'Escaldes	Casa Estrella del Benfica	Deportivo La Massana
2004–05	FC Santa Coloma B^{2}	UE Extremenya	UE Engordany
2005–06	FC Encamp	UE Engordany	Casa Estrella del Benfica
2006–07	Casa Estrella del Benfica	FC Santa Coloma B	UE Engordany
2007–08	UE Santa Coloma	UE Extremenya	FC Encamp
2008–09	FC Encamp	Atlètic Club d'Escaldes	FC Lusitanos B
2009–10	Casa Estrella del Benfica	FC Lusitanos B	UE Extremenya
2010–11	FC Lusitanos B^{2}	FC Rànger's	UE Engordany
2011–12	FC Encamp	UE Extremenya	FC Lusitanos B
2012–13	FC Ordino	FC Lusitanos B	FC Santa Coloma B
2013–14	UE Engordany	CE Jenlai	FC Rànger's
2014–15	Penya Encarnada d'Andorra	Atlètic Club d'Escaldes	FC Rànger's
2015–16	CE Jenlai	CE Carroi	Atlètic Club d'Escaldes
2016–17	Inter Club d'Escaldes	Penya Encarnada d'Andorra	CF Atlètic Amèrica
2017–18	FC Ordino	Atlètic Club d'Escaldes	CE Carroi
2018–19	Atlètic Club d'Escaldes	CE Carroi	La Massana
2019–20	Penya Encarnada	La Massana	Encamp
2020–21	FC Ordino	La Massana	Encamp
2021–22	Penya Encarnada	La Massana	UE Extremenya
2022–23	FC Pas de la Casa	CF Atlètic Amèrica	CF Esperança d'Andorra
2023–24	La Massana	FC Rànger's	UE Santa Coloma B
2024–25	Carroi	Atlètic Amèrica^{3}	City Escaldes
2025–26	SC Escalades	Casa de Portugal	La Massana

^{1}Club dissolved after season, runner-up was promoted.

^{2}Club ineligible for promotion, runner-up was promoted.

^{3}Club ineligible for promotion, third place went to play-off.

=== Performance by club ===
Club	Winners	Runners-up	Third-place	Winning years	Runners-up years	Third-place years
Penya Encarnada d'Andorra	3	1	0	2015, 2020, 2022	2017	–
FC Encamp	3	0	3	2006, 2009, 2012	–	2008, 2020, 2021
FC Ordino	3	0	0	2013, 2018, 2021	–	–
Atlètic Club d'Escaldes	2	3	2	2004, 2019	2009, 2015, 2018	2003, 2016
CE Benfica	2	2	1	2007, 2010	2003, 2004	2006
UE Engordany	2	1	3	2003, 2014	2006	2005, 2007, 2011
FC Lusitanos B	1	3	2	2011	2001, 2010, 2013	2009, 2012
FS La Massana	1	3	2	2024	2020, 2021, 2022	2019, 2026
CE Carroi	1	2	1	2025	2016, 2019	2018
FC Rànger's	1	2	2	2001	2011, 2024	2014, 2015
FC Santa Coloma B	1	1	4	2005	2007	2000, 2001, 2002, 2013
CE Jenlai	1	1	0	2016	2014	–
FC Lusitanos	1	0	0	2000	–	–
Racing D'Andorra	1	0	0	2002	–	–
UE Santa Coloma	1	0	0	2008	–	–
Inter Club d'Escaldes	1	0	0	2017	–	–
FC Pas de la Casa	1	0	0	2023	–	–
SC Escalades	1	0	0	2026	–	–
UE Extremenya	0	4	2	–	2002, 2005, 2008, 2012	2010, 2022
CF Atlètic Amèrica	0	2	1	–	2023, 2025	2017
Deportivo La Massana	0	1	1	–	2000	2004
CE Casa de Portugal	0	1	0	–	2026	–
CF Esperança d'Andorra	0	0	1	–	–	2023
UE Santa Coloma B	0	0	1	–	–	2024
City Escaldes	0	0	1	–	–	2025

== Topscorers ==
Year	Best scorers	Team	Goals
2009/10	(Peru) Carlos Otiniano	CE Jenlai	15
2010/11	(Portugal) Lionel Correia	FC Lusitanos B	35
2011/12	(Portugal) Lionel Correia	FC Lusitanos B	22
2012/13	(Andorra) Carlos Manuel Gomes	FC Ordino	27
2013/14	(Spain) German Damia Fernandez	CE Jenlai	19
2013/14	(Andorra) Rachid Agharbi	UE Extremenya	19
2014/15	(Portugal) Joao Manuel Lima Moreira	Penya Encarnada d'Andorra	24
2015/16	(Andorra) Diego Rafael Marinho	CE Jenlai	41
2016/17	(Spain) Francisco José Peña Martínez	Atlètic Club d'Escaldes	31
2017/18	(Andorra) Manuel Vicente Lopez Vila	FS La Massana	24
2018/19	(Venezuela) Alejandro Manuel Muñoz Caballé	CE Carroi	29
2019/20	(Andorra) Diego Rafael Marinho	FS La Massana	30
