= CE Jenlai =

Association football club in Andorra

- Full name: Club Esportiu Jenlai
- Founded: 2008; 17 years ago
- Ground: Andorra Football Federation stadiums
- Chairman: Hugo Roldán
- Manager: Joaquín Pina
- Coach: Alberto Párraga
- League: (?)
- 2021–22: Segona Divisió, 12th
Home colours	Away colours

CE Jenlai, also known simply as Jenlai, is an Andorran football team based in the village of Escaldes-Engordany. The club currently plays in Segona Divisió.

== History ==
CE Jenlai were founded in 2008 under the name of Atlètic Amèrica. During the 2008–09 season the club was renamed CE Jenlai. The Andorran team was playing in Segona Divisió until 2011, for three consecutive seasons. After two seasons, in 2013 the club returned to Segona Divisió recording a notable season finishing 2nd and being able to compete at the promotion play-offs. They lost 1–6 in aggregate against Inter Club d'Escaldes. Two seasons later Jenlai achieved the promotion to Primera Divisió after winning the Segona Divisió title in 2016.

== Identity ==
The team was mostly composed and founded by Peruvian players. Their current club's crest, introduced in 2013, is a variation of the Peruvian coat of arms.

== Honours ==
- Segona Divisió:
  - Winners: 2015–16
  - Runners-up: 2013–14

== Current squad ==
As of 20 November 2016

Note: Flags indicate national team as defined under FIFA eligibility rules; some limited exceptions apply. Players may hold more than one non-FIFA nationality.

No.	Pos.	Nation	Player
1	GK	(Portugal) POR	Nelson Teixeira
2	DF	(Spain) ESP	Lopes Martins
3	DF	(Andorra) AND	Daniel Ribeiro
4	DF	(Portugal) POR	José Da Costa
6	FW	(Andorra) AND	João Veloso
7	DF	(Spain) ESP	García Curto
8	MF	(Andorra) AND	Manuel Albino
9	DF	(Portugal) POR	Segio Coelho
10	MF	(Andorra) AND	Dominic Pereira
11	MF	(Andorra) AND	Albert Pous

No.	Pos.	Nation	Player
14	MF	(Peru) PER	Ivan Garcia
16	DF	(Peru) PER	Roger Zambrano
17	FW	(Portugal) POR	Ricardo Caravalho
19	FW	(Argentina) ARG	Federico Pisculichi (Captain)
20	GK	(Andorra) AND	Hugo Do Paço
21	FW	(Portugal) POR	Lio Correia
22	MF	(Andorra) AND	Nuno Barros
23	FW	(Peru) PER	Manuel López
25	DF	(Andorra) AND	Arnau Fernández
