= Casa Estrella del Benfica =

Association football club in Andorra

Casa del Benfica
- Full name: Futbol Club Casa Estrella del Benfica
- Nickname(s): Las Camieras (The Foresters)
- Founded: 2003
- Dissolved: 2014
- Ground: Andorra Football Federation stadiums
- 2013–14: Segona Divisió, 15th
Home colours	Away colours

Futbol Club Casa Estrella del Benfica was an Andorran football club from La Massana.

They had played in the top flight of Andorra twice, in the 2008/09 and 2010/11 season. In 2014 the club was not registered in the Second Division for the 2014/15 season being out of competition and dissolved the same year.

Like FC Lusitanos the club CE Benfica, founded in 2003, reflected its Portuguese identity. The club also had a good relation with Penya Encarnada d'Andorra.

== Colors and badge ==
As the colors and badge are related with the Portuguese club S.L. Benfica. The traditional club color was red and the badge was a minor variation of the Benfica's sports club.

== Honours ==
- Segona Divisió
  - Champions (2): 2006–07, 2009–10
