= FS La Massana =

Association football club in Andorra

La Massana
- Full name: Futbol Sala La Massana
- Founded: 2005; 21 years ago
- Ground: Andorra Football Federation stadiums
- Chairman: Arnau Saborit Mascarell
- Manager: Tomas Ferri Sergio
- League: Segona Divisió
- 2025–26: 3rd
Home colours	Away colours

FS La Massana is an Andorran football club based in the parish of La Massana, founded in 2005. The club currently competes in the Segona Divisió and the Copa Constitució.
