= FC Encamp =

Association football club in Andorra

Encamp
- Full name: Fútbol Club Encamp
- Nicknames: Encampadans; El degà (The Dean)
- Founded: 1950; 76 years ago
- Ground: Camp de Futbol d'Encamp
- Capacity: 550
- Chairman: Salvador Cervós
- Manager: Leonel Gancedo
- League: Segona Divisió
- 2021–22: 6th
- Website: http://www.fcencamp.org/
Home colours	Away colours

FC Encamp is an Andorran football club based in Encamp. Founded in 1950, it is the oldest football club of the Andorran First Division. The club currently plays in Primera Divisió.

== History ==
FC Encamp was founded in 1950 being the dean of the Andorran premier league and the second football club created in the pyrenean country of Andorra after FC Andorra (founded in 1942). Successfully the team won the Primera Divisió in the 1995–96 season, and five years later their second league title (2001–02) qualifying for the UEFA Cup. Next season they ended the regular league in the 2nd position being able to play in the UEFA Intertoto Cup.

Although for the 2004/05 season they were relegated to Segona Divisió, the 2nd best division. In 2005–06, they were promoted back to the Primera Divisió. The same story was repeated in the 2006–07 season finishing in 7th place of the table and being relegated, coming back in 2009 at the top league.

However, during two bad seasons in the Andorran Premier League finally FC Encamp were relegated in 2011, returning the 2011–12 season in the top flight. Since then the club have been playing in the top tier of Andorra.

At the end of the 2015–16 season Encamp finished 7th in the regular season and were originally set to compete in a two-legged relegation play-off against CE Carroi. It was announced that Encamp were awarded the tie against CE Carroi 3-0 due illegal lineup during the first leg of the relegation play-offs, therefore Encamp remained in the top flight.

== Colours and badge ==
FC Encamp takes the colours from the parish of Encamp. Since their foundation blue have been the traditional colour of the Andorran club. Although white and blue, along with red or purple, represent also the club and the northern parish.

Colours are blue and white hoop/striped shirts and blue shorts for home matches, and red and white hoop/striped shirts and red shorts for away matches. Although some seasons the club have worn blue shirts and black/white shorts for home matches.

Striped home kit.	All blue kit during 1990s and early 2000s.	All blue kit late variation.

== Facilities and stadium ==
FC Encamp is the only club of Primera Divisió that has its own stadium along with the local government of Encamp. The stadium with 550 capacity (Camp de Futbol d'Encamp) and all the club facilities (training center and outdoor stadium) are located in Prada de Moles, inaugurated in November 2015. The club also owns a futsal indoor stadium (Complex Esportiu Federic Palmitjavila).

== Honours ==
- Primera Divisió:
  - Winners (2): 1995–96, 2001–02
  - Runners-up (1): 2002–03
- Copa Constitució:
  - Runners-up (1): 2000
- Segona Divisió:
  - Winners (3): 2005–06, 2008–09, 2011–12

== European results ==
Season	Competition	Round	Club	Home	Away	Agg.
2002–03	2002–03 UEFA Cup	1QR	(Russia) Zenit Saint Petersburg	0-5	0–8	0–13
2003–04	2003 UEFA Intertoto Cup	1R	(Belgium) Lierse	0-3	1–4	1–7

== League history ==
Season	Division	Pos.	Pl.	W	D	L	GS	GA	P
2010–11	Primera Divisió	7	20	4	1	15	24	79	13
2011–12	Segona Divisió	1	18	14	0	4	57	22	42
2012–13	Primera Divisió	7	20	5	2	13	18	55	17
2013–14	Primera Divisió	6	20	7	4	9	34	53	25
2014–15	Primera Divisió	6	20	7	3	10	21	34	24
2015–16	Primera Divisió	7	20	4	4	12	22	50	16

== Current squad ==
As of 17 February 2019

Note: Flags indicate national team as defined under FIFA eligibility rules; some limited exceptions apply. Players may hold more than one non-FIFA nationality.

No.	Pos.	Nation	Player
2	FW	ARG	Walter Gómez
3	FW	AND	Romain Dalibon
6	MF	AND	Antonio Marinho
8	DF	AND	Gabriel Fernández
9	FW	PAR	Eugenio Peralta
10	MF	ARG	Tomás Lanzini
11	MF	ARG	Gonzalo Ucha
12	GK	ESP	Gerardo Rubio
14	MF	AND	Ferran Montobbio
15	DF	AND	Rafel Cervós
16	DF	CMR	Derrick Dibotti

No.	Pos.	Nation	Player
17	DF	AND	Cristian Barreto
19	FW	AND	Andreu Matos
21	FW	ARG	Nicolás Minutella
22	DF	AND	André Marinho
24	MF	ARG	Diego Sánchez
27	FW	AND	Eric Pelfort
—	DF	AND	Jonathan Ferreira
—	MF	ESP	Jaime Bauza
—	MF	ESP	Tete López
—	MF	ARG	Renzo Dezotti
