= Atlètic Club d'Escaldes =

Association football club in Andorra

Atlètic d'Escaldes
- Full name: Atlètic Club d'Escaldes
- Nickname: L'Atlètic
- Founded: 2002; 24 years ago
- Ground: Andorra Football Federation stadiums
- Chairman: Petra Schellens
- Manager: Dani Luque
- League: Primera Divisió
- 2024–25: Primera Divisió, 2nd of 10
| Home colours | Away colours |

Atlètic Club d'Escaldes, commonly known as Atlètic d'Escaldes, is an Andorran professional football club based in Escaldes-Engordany, currently playing in Primera Divisió.

== History ==
Atlètic Club d'Escaldes was founded on 20 May 2002 in Escaldes-Engordany, joining Segona Divisió the same year. At the end of 2003–04 season the club was promoted to Primera Divisió. During three seasons the club was playing in the top flight until 2006–07 season when it was relegated to Segona Divisió. The club came back in the top flight in 2019 after winning the 2018–19 Segona Divisió.

L'Atlètic reached the 2021 Copa Constitució final but lost against UE Sant Julià 2–1. Again the club reached the finals the following season, winning the 2022 trophy 4–1 against UE Extremenya.

== Colours and badge ==
Blue is the traditional colour of the club. Since their foundation and until 2015 the club wore yellow and blue in horizontal or vertical stripes. The old shield was replaced the same year.

| Original first kit. | Alternative first kit. | Grana kit worn from 2016 until 2019. |

== Honours ==
- Primera Divisió:
  - Winners (1): 2022–23
- Segona Divisió:
  - Winners (2): 2003–04, 2018–19
- Copa Constitució:
  - Winners (2): 2022, 2026
  - Runners-up (2): 2021, 2025
- Supercopa Andorrana:
  - Winners (1): 2025
  - Runners-up (3): 2022, 2023, 2026

== European results ==
| Season | Competition | Round | Club | Home | Away | Agg. |
|---|---|---|---|---|---|---|
| 2022–23 | UEFA Conference League | 1QR | (Malta) Gżira United | 0–1 (a.e.t.) | 1–1 | 1–2 |
| 2023–24 | UEFA Champions League | PR | (Montenegro) FK Budućnost Podgorica | 0–3 | | |
| 2023–24 | UEFA Conference League | 2QR | (Albania) Partizani | 0–1 | 1–4 | 1–5 |
| 2024–25 | UEFA Conference League | 1QR | (Luxembourg) F91 Dudelange | 0–1 | 0–2 | 0–3 |
| 2025–26 | UEFA Conference League | 1QR | (Luxembourg) F91 Dudelange | 2–0 | 3–2 | 5–2 |
| 2025–26 | UEFA Conference League | 2QR | (Albania) Dinamo City | 1–2 | 1–1 | 2–3 |
| 2026–27 | UEFA Conference League | 1QR | (Montenegro) Mornar | 2–1 | 2–1 | 4–2 |
| 2026–27 | UEFA Conference League | 2QR | (Liechtenstein) Vaduz | 0–2 | 0–4 | 0–6 |

Notes

- PR: Preliminary round
- QR: Qualifying round
- 1Q: First qualifying round
- 2Q: Second qualifying round

== Players ==
=== Current squad ===
As of 6 April 2026

Note: Flags indicate national team as defined under FIFA eligibility rules; some limited exceptions apply. Players may hold more than one non-FIFA nationality.

| No. | Pos. | Nation | Player |
|---|---|---|---|
| 1 | GK | ESP | Adrià Muñoz |
| 2 | DF | ESP | Christian Jiménez |
| 3 | DF | ESP | Marcos Blasco |
| 4 | DF | ESP | Yeray Carpio |
| 5 | DF | ESP | Chinchu |
| 6 | DF | BRA | Emanoel |
| 7 | FW | ESP | Juan Barragán |
| 8 | FW | CIV | Jean Luc |
| 9 | FW | ESP | Borja Morales |
| 10 | MF | GNB | Gemelson |
| 11 | MF | ESP | David Valero |
| 14 | MF | ESP | Hamza Bouharma |

| No. | Pos. | Nation | Player |
|---|---|---|---|
| 15 | DF | ESP | Sergio Rodriguez |
| 17 | MF | ESP | Sohaib Boulayoune |
| 19 | DF | AND | Didi |
| 20 | FW | ESP | Jota Sanmarful |
| 21 | MF | AND | Marc Pujol |
| 22 | FW | CHI | Pablo Brito |
| 23 | MF | ROU | Kevin Olah |
| 30 | GK | COL | Francisco Cano |
| 32 | GK | ARG | Matías Basterrechea |
| 49 | DF | ESP | Adrià Gallego |
| — | MF | FRA | Souleyman Talbi |

== First League history ==
| Season | | Pos. | Pl. | W | D | L | GS | GA | P |
|---|---|---|---|---|---|---|---|---|---|
| 2004–05 | Campionat de Lliga | 7 | 20 | 5 | 0 | 15 | 19 | 58 | 15 |
| 2005–06 | Campionat de Lliga | 6 | 20 | 8 | 4 | 8 | 21 | 27 | 28 |
| 2006–07 | Campionat de Lliga | 8 | 20 | 4 | 3 | 13 | 18 | 45 | 15 |
| 2019–20 | Primera Divisió | 6 | 24 | 8 | 6 | 10 | 32 | 29 | 30 |
| 2020–21 | Primera Divisió | 4 | 20 | 6 | 7 | 7 | 29 | 26 | 25 |
| 2021–22 | Primera Divisió | 4 | 27 | 11 | 10 | 6 | 44 | 30 | 43 |
| 2022–23 | Primera Divisió | 1 | 28 | 19 | 6 | 3 | 68 | 19 | 63 |
