= 2024 Copa Constitució =

Tournament details
- Country: Andorra
- Teams: 11

Final positions
- Champions: UE Santa Coloma
- Runners-up: Pas de la Casa

Tournament statistics
- Matches played: 10
- Goals scored: 28 (2.8 per match)

The 2024 Copa Constitució was the 32nd edition of the Andorran national football knockout tournament. The winners qualified for the 2024–25 Conference League first qualifying round.

UE Santa Coloma won the cup on 26 May 2024 (their fourth Copa Constitució win), defeating Pas de la Casa 1–0 in the final. Since they qualified based on league position, the Conference League spot was passed to the third-placed team of the 2023–24 Primera Divisió.

== First round ==
Six clubs from the 2023–24 Primera Divisió entered the first round; the remaining Primera Divisió clubs and one club from the 2023–24 Segona Divisió (Rànger's) received byes.

Team 1	Score	Team 2
14 January 2024
Esperança (1)	1–2	Atlètic Amèrica (1)
Penya Encarnada (1)	2–2 (a.e.t.) (4–3 p)	FC Santa Coloma (1)
Carroi (1)	2–3	UE Santa Coloma (1)

== Quarter-finals ==
The three first round winners and the five clubs given first round byes entered the quarter-finals.

Team 1	Score	Team 2
16 March 2024
Ordino (1)	1–1 (a.e.t.) (3–4 p)	Pas de la Casa (1)
17 March 2024
UE Santa Coloma (1)	1–0	Penya Encarnada (1)
Inter Club d'Escaldes (1)	1–0	Atlètic Amèrica (1)
Rànger's (2)	0–4	Atlètic Club d'Escaldes (1)

== Semi-finals ==
The four quarter-final winners entered the semi-finals.

Team 1	Score	Team 2
24 April 2024
Inter Club d'Escaldes (1)	3–3 (a.e.t.) (3–4 p)	Pas de la Casa (1)
25 April 2024
Atlètic Club d'Escaldes (1)	0–1	UE Santa Coloma (1)

== Final ==
The final was held between the two semi-final winners.

26 May 2024
18:00

UE Santa Coloma	1–0 (a.e.t.)	Pas de la Casa
Chouaib 117'

Estadi Nacional, Andorra la Vella
Referee: Antoine Chiaramonti

== See also ==
- 2023–24 Primera Divisió
- 2023–24 Segona Divisió
