= 2022–23 Segona Divisió =

Segona Divisió
- Season: 2022–23
- Champions: Pas de la Casa
- Promoted: Pas de la Casa; Atlètic Amèrica; Esperança; Carroi
- Matches: 102
- Goals: 497 (4.87 per match)
- Biggest home win: Pas de la Casa 10–0 FC Santa Coloma B (30 October 2022)
- Biggest away win: UE Santa Coloma B 0–11 Pas de la Casa (22 October 2022)
- Highest scoring: Rànger's 1–11 Pas de la Casa (26 March 2023); La Massana 10–2 Encamp (26 March 2023)
- Longest winning run: 8 matches Esperança (28 January 2023-15 April 2023)
- Longest unbeaten run: 24 matches Pas de la Casa (18 September 2022-21 May 2023)
- Longest winless run: 16 matches FC Santa Coloma B (24 September 2022-4 March 2023)
- Longest losing run: 16 matches FC Santa Coloma B (24 September 2022-4 March 2023)

The 2022–23 Segona Divisió, also known as Lliga UNIDA, was the 24th season of second-tier football in Andorra. The season began on 17 September 2022 and ended on 21 May 2023.

== Teams ==
Penya Encarnada won the league the previous season, and were promoted to the Primera Divisió. Carroi were relegated from the Primera Divisió and joined the Segona Divisió. Ordino B withdrew from the league and all of their results were void.

== League table ==
Pos	Team	Pld	W	D	L	GF	GA	GD	Pts	Qualification
1	Pas de la Casa	18	15	3	0	99	7	+92	48	Advance to play-off round
2	Atlètic Amèrica	18	14	2	2	57	21	+36	44	Advance to play-off round
3	Esperança	18	12	4	2	49	17	+32	40	Advance to play-off round
4	Carroi	18	10	3	5	50	30	+20	33	Advance to play-off round
5	La Massana	18	8	4	6	48	28	+20	28	Advance to play-off round
6	Encamp	18	9	1	8	42	41	+1	28	Advance to play-off round
7	Rànger's	18	7	1	10	35	54	−19	22	Advance to play-off round
8	FC Santa Coloma B	18	2	0	16	17	87	−70	6	
9	Engordany B	18	2	0	16	12	70	−58	6	
10	UE Santa Coloma B	18	2	0	16	18	72	−54	6	
11	Ordino B	0	0	0	0	0	0	0	0	Withdrew

Source: FAF
Rules for classification: 1) points; 2) head-to-head points; 3) head-to-head goal difference; 4) head-to-head goals scored; 5) goal difference; 6) goals scored

== Results ==
Home \ Away	PAS	ATL	ESP	CAR	MAS	ENC	RAN	SFC	ENG	SUE	ORD
Pas de la Casa		5–0	0–0	2–2	1–1	4–0	8–0	10–0	8–0	6–1	
Atlètic Amèrica	0–3		2–2	2–2	2–1	4–2	3–0	9–1	1–0	4–1	
Esperança	0–5	1–3		1–0	3–1	2–1	6–0	5–0	2–1	2–1	
Carroi	2–6	1–4	0–3		5–1	6–1	1–0	4–2	4–0	1–0	
La Massana	0–3	0–1	0–0	2–2		10–2	2–1	8–0	4–2	3–1	
Encamp	0–4	0–1	1–1	2–1	2–0		1–2	8–0	3–0	4–2	
Rànger's	1–11	1–4	1–5	1–2	3–3	1–2		6–2	2–1	4–0	
FC Santa Coloma B	0–3	1–8	0–5	1–5	0–3	0–6	1–2		1–2	4–1	
Engordany B	0–9	0–6	0–7	2–6	0–3	0–2	0–6	0–3		1–2	
UE Santa Coloma B	0–11	0–3	1–4	0–6	0–6	3–5	2–4	2–1	1–3		
Ordino B											

Source: Soccerway.com
Legend: Blue = home team win; Yellow = draw; Red = away team win.
For upcoming matches, an "a" indicates there is an article about the rivalry between the two participants.

== Play–off round ==
Pos	Team	Pld	W	D	L	GF	GA	GD	Pts	Promotion or qualification
1	Pas de la Casa (C, P)	24	20	4	0	119	10	+109	64	Promotion to Primera Divisió
2	Atlètic Amèrica (P)	24	17	4	3	71	27	+44	55	Promotion to Primera Divisió
3	Esperança (P)	24	15	5	4	58	25	+33	50	Promotion to Primera Divisió
4	Carroi (O, P)	24	15	3	6	65	34	+31	48	Qualification to play-offs
5	La Massana	24	10	4	10	56	40	+16	34	
6	Encamp	24	9	1	14	42	59	−17	28	
7	Rànger's	24	8	1	15	39	73	−34	25	

Source: FAF soccerway.com
Rules for classification: 1) points; 2) head-to-head points; 3) head-to-head goal difference; 4) head-to-head goals scored; 5) goal difference; 6) goals scored
(C) Champions; (O) Play-off winners; (P) Promoted

=== Results ===
Home \ Away	PAS	ATL	ESP	CAR	MAS	RAN	ENC
Pas de la Casa			2–0	2–1		8–0	
Atlètic Amèrica	2–2			2–3		3–0	
Esperança		1–1			3–2		3–0
Carroi			2–0		3–0		3–0
La Massana	0–3	0–3					3–0
Rànger's			1–2	0–3	0–3		
Encamp	0–3	0–3				0–3	

Source: soccerway.com
Legend: Blue = home team win; Yellow = draw; Red = away team win.
For upcoming matches, an "a" indicates there is an article about the rivalry between the two participants.

== Primera Divisió play-offs ==
The seventh-placed team, and the third-placed in the relegation round, from the Primera Divisió Engordany and the runners-up from the Segona Divisió, Carroi, played a play-off over two legs for a place in the 2023–24 Primera Divisió.

All times are in Central European Summer Time (UTC+2:00).

27 May 2023
20:30

Carroi	2–0	Engordany
García 4'; Cinco 55'	Report

Camp de Futbol La Massana, La Massana
31 May 2023
20:30

Engordany	0–2 (0–4 Agg.)	Carroi
		Bravo 63', 70'

Centre d'Entrenament de la FAF 1, Escaldes–Engordany

== See also ==
- 2022–23 Primera Divisió
- 2023 Copa Constitució
