= 2026 Copa Constitució =

Tournament details
- Country: Andorra
- Teams: 12

The 2026 Copa Constitució was the 34th edition of the Andorran national football knockout tournament. The winners qualified for the 2026–27 UEFA Conference League first qualifying round.

== First round ==
Twelve clubs participated in this round. Two clubs (Atlètic Club d'Escaldes and CF Esperança) received a bye to the quarter-finals. The matches were played on 11 January 2026.

Team 1	Score	Team 2
11 January 2026
FC Santa Coloma (1)	5–1	Sporting Escaldes (2)
UE Santa Coloma (1)	2–0	CE Principat (2)
Inter Club d'Escaldes (1)	3–0	FS La Massana (2)
Carroi (1)	0–0 (1–4 p)	Casa de Portugal (2)
Penya Encarnada (1)	0–3	FC Ranger's (1)
City Escaldes (2)	1–2	FC Ordino (1)

== Quarter-finals ==
The six winners from the first round joined the two clubs that received a bye to compete in the quarter-finals. All matches in this round were played on 19 March 2026.

Team 1	Score	Team 2
11–13 March 2026
UE Santa Coloma (1)	3–0	FC Ordino (1)
Casa de Portugal (2)	1–4	Inter Club d'Escaldes (1)
Atlètic Club d'Escaldes (1)	5–0	Esperança (1)
Rànger's (1)	0–1	FC Santa Coloma (1)

== Semi-finals ==
Team 1	Score	Team 2
30 April 2026
Atlètic Club d'Escaldes (1)	2–1	Inter Club d'Escaldes (1)
FC Santa Coloma (1)	3–0 (aet)	UE Santa Coloma (1)

== Final ==
Team 1	Score	Team 2
23 May 2026
Atlètic Club d'Escaldes (1)	3–2	FC Santa Coloma (1)

== See also ==
- 2025–26 Primera Divisió
- 2025–26 Segona Divisió
