= Andrés García (footballer, born 1996) =

Spanish footballer

Personal information
- Full name: Andrés García Mohedano
- Date of birth: 11 May 1996 (age 30)
- Place of birth: Madrid, Spain
- Height: 1.81 m (5 ft 11 in)
- Position: Midfielder

Team information
- Current team: Čelik Zenica
- Number: 8

Youth career
- Getafe
- Atlético Madrid

Senior career*
Years	Team	Apps	(Gls)
2015	Atlético Madrid C	3	(0)
2015–2017	Atlético Madrid B	7	(1)
2016–2017	→ La Roda (loan)	22	(1)
2017–2019	Granada B	67	(4)
2019–2021	Mirandés	10	(1)
2020	→ Andorra (loan)	6	(0)
2021	Numancia	14	(2)
2021–2022	Melilla	12	(2)
2022	Pulpileño	15	(0)
2022–2023	Las Rozas	24	(5)
2023	Penya Encarnada	12	(3)
2024	UE Santa Coloma	26	(4)
2025	Inter Club d'Escaldes	13	(3)
2025–2026	Rudar Prijedor	32	(5)
2026–	Čelik Zenica	12	(0)
- * Club domestic league appearances and goals as of 31 October 2026

Andrés García Mohedano (born 11 May 1996) is a Spanish professional footballer who plays as a midfielder for Bosnian Premier League club Čelik Zenica.

== Club career ==
Born in Madrid, García represented Getafe CF and Atlético Madrid as a youth, and made his senior debut with the latter's C-team in 2015, in Tercera División. On 1 September 2016, after one full campaign with the reserves also in the fourth division, he joined Segunda División B side La Roda CF on loan for one year.

In July 2017, García agreed to a deal with Granada CF and was assigned to the B-team also in the third division. On 23 July 2019, after being a regular starter for the Andalusians, he joined Segunda División side CD Mirandés on a two-year contract.

García made his professional debut on 17 August 2019, starting and scoring his team's second in a 2–2 away draw against Rayo Vallecano. The following 27 January, after featuring rarely, he was loaned to third division side FC Andorra for the remainder of the season.

On 22 January 2021, García terminated his contract with the Rojillos, and signed for third division side CD Numancia three days later.

== Career statistics ==
=== Club ===
As of match played 31 October 2026

Appearances and goals by club, season and competition
Club	Season	League			National cup (Note: Includes Copa del Rey, Copa Constitució, Bosnian Cup)		Continental		Other		Total	
Club	Season	Division	Apps	Goals	Apps	Goals	Apps	Goals	Apps	Goals	Apps	Goals
Atlético Madrid C	2014–15	Tercera División	3	0	—		—		—		3	0
Atlético Madrid B	2015–16	Tercera División	7	1	—		—		—		7	1
La Roda (loan)	2016–17	Segunda División B	22	1	—		—		—		22	1
Granada B	2017–18	Segunda División B	31	1	—		—		—		31	1
Granada B	2018–19	Segunda División B	36	3	—		—		—		36	3
Granada B	Total		67	4	—		—		—		67	4
Mirandés	2019–20	Segunda División	8	1	2	0	—		—		10	1
Mirandés	2020–21	Segunda División	2	0	1	0	—		—		3	0
Mirandés	Total		10	1	3	0	—		—		13	1
Andorra (loan)	2019–20	Segunda División B	6	0	—		—		—		6	0
Numancia	2020–21	Segunda División B	14	2	—		—		—		14	2
Melilla	2021–22	Segunda Federación	12	2	—		—		1 (Note: Appearance in Copa Federación de España)	0	13	2
Pulpileño	2021–22	Segunda Federación	15	0	—		—		—		15	0
Las Rozas	2022–23	Tercera Federación	24	5	1	0	—		—		25	5
Penya Encarnada	2023–24	Primera Divisió	12	3	—		—		—		12	3
UE Santa Coloma	2023–24	Primera Divisió	13	1	1	0	—		1 (Note: Appearance in Andorran Supercup)	0	15	1
UE Santa Coloma	2024–25	Primera Divisió	13	3	0	0	8 (Note: Four appearances in UEFA Champions League, two appearances in UEFA Europa League, two appearances in UEFA Conference League)	0	—		21	3
UE Santa Coloma	Total		26	4	1	0	8	0	1	0	36	4
Inter Club d'Escaldes	2024–25	Primera Divisió	13	3	4	0	—		—		17	3
Inter Club d'Escaldes	2025–26	Primera Divisió	0	0	—		2 (Note: Appearances in UEFA Champions League)	0	—		2	0
Inter Club d'Escaldes	Total		13	3	4	0	2	0	—		19	3
Rudar Prijedor	2025–26	Bosnian Premier League	32	5	2	0	—		—		34	5
Čelik Zenica	2026–27	Bosnian Premier League	12	0	0	0	—		—		12	0
Career total			275	31	11	0	10	0	2	0	298	31
