= Rafinha (footballer, born 1997) =

Spanish footballer (born 1997)

Personal information
- Full name: Rafael Baldrés Hermann
- Date of birth: 29 December 1997 (age 28)
- Place of birth: Zaragoza, Spain
- Height: 1.75 m (5 ft 9 in)
- Position: Forward

Team information
- Current team: Inter Club d'Escaldes

Youth career
- –2014: Espanyol
- 2014–2015: Teruel
- 2015–2016: Mallorca
- 2016–2017: Almudévar

Senior career*
Years	Team	Apps	(Gls)
2015	Teruel	1	(0)
2016–2017	Almudévar		
2017–2018	La Almunia	24	(5)
2018–2019	San Juan de Mozarrifar	13	(1)
2019–2020	Utebo	28	(9)
2020–2021	Ejea	6	(0)
2021	→ Utebo (loan)	9	(5)
2021–2022	Barbastro	28	(6)
2022–2024	Épila	58	(24)
2024–2025	Inter Club d'Escaldes	27	(12)
2025–2026	Petrolul Ploiești	15	(1)
2026–	Inter Club d'Escaldes	0	(0)
- * Club domestic league appearances and goals as of 18 May 2026

Rafael Baldrés Hermann (born 29 December 1997), commonly known as Rafinha, is a Spanish professional footballer who plays as a forward for Primera Divisió club Inter Club d'Escaldes.

== Honours ==
Inter Club d'Escaldes

- Primera Divisió: 2024–25
- Copa Constitució: 2025
- Andorran Supercup runner-up: 2024
