= Felip Ortiz =

Spanish footballer and manager

Felip
Personal information
- Full name: Felip Ortíz Martínez
- Date of birth: 27 April 1977 (age 49)
- Place of birth: Lleida, Spain
- Height: 1.79 m (5 ft 10 1/2 in)
- Position: Goalkeeper

Team information
- Current team: Inter d'Escaldes (manager)

Youth career
- 1983–1992: AEM Lleida
- 1992–1996: Barcelona

Senior career*
Years	Team	Apps	(Gls)
1996–1998	Barcelona C	42	(0)
1996–1999	Barcelona B	36	(0)
1999–2002	Extremadura	53	(0)
2002–2005	Gimnástic	85	(0)
2005–2007	Salamanca	65	(0)
2007–2008	Orihuela	22	(0)
2008–2010	Gimnástic	8	(0)
2010–2012	Ascó	34	(0)
2012	Morell		
2012	Torreforta		
Total		345	(0)

International career
1997	Spain U20	3	(0)
1998–1999	Spain U21	6	(0)

Managerial career
- 2015–2018: Barcelona B (assistant)
- 2021: Gimnàstic (youth)
- 2021–2022: Barcelona B (assistant)
- 2021: Barcelona (interim assistant)
- 2022–2023: Al Shabab (assistant)
- 2024–: Inter d'Escaldes
Medal record
Men's Football
Representing Spain
Silver medal – second place	2000 Sydney	Team competition
- * Club domestic league appearances and goals

Felip Ortíz Martínez (born 27 April 1977), known simply as Felip, is a Spanish former professional footballer who played as a goalkeeper. He is currently manager of Primera Divisió club Inter Club d'Escaldes.

== Club career ==
Born in Lleida, Catalonia, the FC Barcelona youth graduate Felip spent his professional career mainly as a backup in the Segunda División, with the addition of four seasons in the Segunda División B. He represented in the former tier FC Barcelona B, CF Extremadura, Gimnàstic de Tarragona (two spells), UD Salamanca and Orihuela CF, appearing in 130 league matches over a decade.

From 2010 to 2012, Felip played amateur football in his native region, retiring at the age of 35.

== International career ==
Felip was selected by Spain for the 2000 Summer Olympics in Sydney, although he failed to make an appearance.

== Coaching career ==
After retiring, Ortiz continued to work with Barcelona, most notably as assistant to Sergi Barjuán in the first and second teams; the former had already been part of the latter's staff at China League One club Zhejiang Greentown F.C. as goalkeeper coach. In the 2022–23 campaign, in the same capacity, he aided another fellow Spaniard, Vicente Moreno, at Saudi Pro League's Al Shabab Club.

On 7 June 2024, Ortiz was appointed head coach of Andorran Primera Divisió side Inter Club d'Escaldes. He won the national championship in his debut season, adding the Copa Constitució to complete a double.

Inter retained their league title in the 2025–26 campaign. After beating FC Drita 4–2 on penalties in the play-off round of the UEFA Conference League, they became the first-ever Andorran club to qualify for the main phase of a European competition.

== Personal life ==
Felip was a close friend of another La Masia youth product, Carles Puyol.

== Honours ==
=== Player ===
Salamanca

- Segunda División B: 2005–06

Spain U23

- Summer Olympic silver medal: 2000

=== Manager ===
Inter d'Escaldes

- Primera Divisió: 2024–25, 2025–26
- Copa Constitució: 2025
