= Dacu =

Andorran footballer

Personal information
- Full name: Adrián Da Cunha Costa Gomes
- Date of birth: 16 May 2001 (age 25)
- Place of birth: Andorra la Vella, Andorra
- Height: 1.71 m (5 ft 7 in)
- Position: Left-back

Team information
- Current team: Inter d'Escaldes
- Number: 17

Youth career
- –2018: ENFAF
- 2018–2021: FC Andorra

Senior career*
Years	Team	Apps	(Gls)
2022	Ordino	14	(0)
2022–2025	UE Santa Coloma	50	(0)
2025–	Inter d'Escaldes	3	(0)

International career^{‡}
2017	Andorra U17	3	(0)
2018–2019	Andorra U19	6	(0)
2020–2022	Andorra U21	10	(0)
2024–	Andorra	14	(0)
- * Club domestic league appearances and goals as of 16 May 2026 ‡ National team caps and goals as of 31 March 2026

Adrián Da Cunha Costa Gomes, known as Dacu (born 16 May 2001) is an Andorran football player who plays as a left-back for Inter Club d'Escaldes and the Andorra national team.

== International career ==
Dacu made his debut for the senior Andorra national team on 21 March 2024 in a friendly against South Africa.

== Career statistics ==
=== Club ===
As of match played 24 November 2024

Appearances and goals by club, season and competition
Club	Season	League			Copa Constitució		Continental		Other		Total	
Club	Season	Division	Apps	Goals	Apps	Goals	Apps	Goals	Apps	Goals	Apps	Goals
Ordino	2021-22	Primera Divisió	14	0	0	0	—		—		14	0
Santa Coloma	2022-23	Primera Divisió	18	0	1	0	0	0	—		19	0
Santa Coloma	2023-24	Primera Divisió	19	0	0	0	—		—		19	0
Santa Coloma	2024-25	Primera Divisió	13	0	1	0	6 (Note: Four appearances in UEFA Champions League, One appearance in UEFA Europa League, One appearance in UEFA Europa Conference League)	0	0	0	20	0
Santa Coloma	Total		64	0	2	0	6	0	0	0	72	0
Career total			64	0	2	0	6	0	0	0	72	0

=== International ===
As of 17 November 2025

Andorra
Year	Apps	Goals
2024	7	0
2025	5	0
Total	12	0
