= 2011 UEFA European Under-21 Championship qualification Group 1 =

Football tournament qualification stage

The teams competing in Group 1 of the 2011 UEFA European Under-21 Championships qualifying competition were Russia, Romania, Moldova, Latvia, Faroe Islands and Andorra.

== Standings ==
Team	Pld	W	D	L	GF	GA	GD	Pts	(Romania)	(Russia)	(Moldova)	(Latvia)	(Faroe Islands)	(Andorra)
Romania	10	8	1	1	23	6	+17	25	—	3–0	3–0	4–1	3–0	2–0
Russia	10	7	1	2	22	6	+16	22	0–0	—	3–1	2–1	2–0	4–0
Moldova	10	4	2	4	9	13	−4	14	0–1	0–3	—	1–0	1–0	1–0
Latvia	10	4	1	5	16	15	+1	13	5–1	0–4	1–1	—	0–1	4–0
Faroe Islands	10	3	2	5	8	16	−8	11	0–4	1–0	1–1	1–3	—	3–1
Andorra	10	0	1	9	3	25	−22	1	0–2	0–4	1–3	0–1	1–1	—

== Matches ==
28 March 2009
17:00 CET

Romania	2–0	Andorra
Gângioveanu 63' (pen.); L. Ganea 73'	Report

Francisc von Neumann, Arad
Attendance: 7,500
Referee: Gediminas Mažeika (Lithuania)

1 April 2009
15:00 CET

Russia	4–0	Andorra
Ionov 14'; Ryzhov 21'; Mamayev 33' (pen.); Kozlov 88'	Report

Kuban Stadium, Krasnodar
Attendance: 5,000
Referee: Tero Nieminen (Finland)

6 June 2009
17:00 CET

Latvia	4–0	Andorra
Gauračs 42' (pen.); Rudņevs 71'; Rugins 74'; Žuļevs 90'	Report

Skonto Stadium, Riga
Attendance: 980
Referee: Ararat Tshagharyan (Armenia)
6 June 2009
20:00 CET

Faroe Islands	0–4	Romania
	Report	Rusescu 14', 56'; Gângioveanu 36'; Torje 67'

Gundadalur, Tórshavn
Attendance: 150
Referee: Richard Trutz (Slovakia)

9 June 2009
20:00 CET

Faroe Islands	1–0	Russia
Edmundsson 1'	Report

Gundadalur, Tórshavn
Attendance: 361
Referee: Alan Black (Northern Ireland)

12 August 2009
17:30 CET

Andorra	0–2	Romania
	Report	Găman 8' (pen.); Torje 64'

Estadi Comunal, Andorra la Vella
Attendance: 420
Referee: Pavle Radovanović (Montenegro)
12 August 2009
18:00 CET

Moldova	1–0	Latvia
Ioniţă 59'	Report

Sheriff Stadium, Tiraspol
Attendance: 300
Referee: Levan Kvaratskhelia (Georgia)

5 September 2009
16:00 CET

Faroe Islands	1–1	Moldova
K. Jacobsen 36'	Report	Sidorenco 24'

Gundadalur, Tórshavn
Attendance: 513
Referee: Radek Příhoda (Czech Republic)
5 September 2009
17:30 CET

Latvia	0–4	Russia
	Report	Kazura 17' (o.g.); Yakovlev 28'; Ryzhov 48'; Gorbatenko 54'

Daugava Stadium, Liepāja
Attendance: 832
Referee: Bülent Yıldırım (Turkey)

8 September 2009
15:30 CET

Andorra	0–4	Russia
	Report	Gorbatenko 17'; Ryzhov 17'; Smolov 47'; Gatagov 84'

Estadi Comunal, Andorra la Vella
Attendance: 370
Referee: Nikola Dabanović (Montenegro)
8 September 2009
19:00 CET

Romania	3–0	Moldova
Torje 12', 48'; Ochiroşii 15'	Report

Ion Oblemenco, Craiova
Attendance: 1,160
Referee: Yunus Yıldırım (Turkey)
9 September 2009
14:00 CET

Faroe Islands	1–3	Latvia
Poulsen 38'	Report	Gauračs 1', 20', 44'

Gundadalur, Tórshavn
Attendance: 1,492
Referee: Christof Virant (Belgium)

9 October 2009
17:30 CET

Latvia	5–1	Romania
Rudņevs 30', 85'; Gauračs 39', 63', 66'	Report	Torje 90+5' (pen.)

Daugava Stadium, Riga
Attendance: 1,200
Referee: Sokol Jareci (Albania)
10 October 2009
14:00 CET

Russia	2–0	Faroe Islands
Ryzhov 21'; Salugin 90+2'	Report

Arena Khimki, Khimki
Attendance: 500
Referee: Vlado Svilokos (Croatia)
10 October 2009
16:00 CET

Moldova	1–0	Andorra
Bogdan 42'	Report

Sheriff Stadium, Tiraspol
Attendance: 500
Referee: Fariz Yusifov (Azerbaijan)

13 October 2009
13:00 CET

Romania	3–0	Faroe Islands
Bicfalvi 5'; L. Ganea 39'; Ionescu 58'	Report

Municipal, Botoşani
Attendance: 5,600
Referee: Nikolay Yordanov (Bulgaria)
14 October 2009
14:00 CET

Russia	3–1	Moldova
Kokorin 5', 41'; Balyaikin 38'	Report	Vornisel 62'

Arena Khimki, Khimki
Attendance: 550
Referee: Luc Wouters (Belgium)

14 November 2009
13:00 CET

Romania	4–1	Latvia
Sburlea 10'; Costea 28'; Papp 43'; Hora 82'	Report	Tarasovs 90'

Municipal, Buzău
Attendance: 4,000
Referee: Richard Liesveld (Netherlands)
14 November 2009
13:00 CET

Moldova	0–3	Russia
	Report	Balyaikin 17'; Mamayev 28'; Gatagov 89' (pen.)

Sheriff Stadium, Tiraspol
Attendance: 2,000
Referee: Nicolai Vollquartz (Denmark)

18 November 2009
13:00 CET

Latvia	0–1	Faroe Islands
	Report	Edmundsson 55'

Daugava Stadium, Riga
Attendance: 2,000
Referee: Ceri Richards (Wales)

21 November 2009
15:00 CET

Andorra	1–1	Faroe Islands
Madeira 51'	Report	Edmundsson 32'

Estadi Comunal, Andorra la Vella
Attendance: 200
Referee: Gabriele Rossi (San Marino)

3 March 2010
15:00 CET

Andorra	1–3	Moldova
Vieira 62'	Report	Pătraş 10'; Dedov 11', 45'

Estadi Comunal, Andorra la Vella
Attendance: 80
Referee: Mario Vlk (Slovakia)

11 August 2010
14:00 CET

Russia	2–1	Latvia
Dzyuba 18', 65'	Report	Turkovs 55' (pen.)

Petrovsky Stadium, Saint Petersburg
Attendance: 3,750
Referee: Tamás Bognár (Hungary)
11 August 2010
15:00 CET

Moldova	0–1	Romania
	Report	L. Ganea 23' (pen.)

Sheriff Stadium, Tiraspol
Attendance: 1,500
Referee: Stelios Trifonos (Cyprus)
11 August 2010
20:00 CET

Faroe Islands	3–1	Andorra
Kamban 51'; Baldvinsson 74'; K. Jacobsen 89'	Report	Blanco 29'

Gundadalur, Tórshavn
Attendance: 467
Referee: Vitaliy Godulyan (Ukraine)

3 September 2010
16:30 CET

Romania	3–0	Russia
Bicfalvi 27'; Sburlea 37'; Hora 86'	Report

Municipal, Botoşani
Attendance: 2,000
Referee: Jiri Jech (Czech Republic)
4 September 2010
15:30 CET

Andorra	0–1	Latvia
	Report	Dubra 14'

Estadi Comunal, Andorra la Vella
Attendance: 250
Referee: Liran Liany (Israel)
4 September 2010
17:00 CET

Moldova	1–0	Faroe Islands
Ioniţă 80'	Report

Sheriff Stadium, Tiraspol
Attendance: 200
Referee: Vlado Glodjovic (Serbia)

7 September 2010
17:00 CET

Russia	0–0	Romania
	Report

Petrovsky Stadium, Saint Petersburg
Attendance: 1,250
Referee: Stuart Attwell (England)
7 September 2010
17:00 CET

Latvia	1–1	Moldova
Bespalovs 80'	Report	Vornișel 35'

Daugava Stadium, Riga
Attendance: 400
Referee: Steven McLean (Scotland)

== Goalscorers ==
There have been 81 goals scored over 30 games, an average of 2.7 goals per game.

Goals	Player	Country
7	Edgars Gauračs	Latvia
5	Gabriel Torje	Romania
4	Dmitri Ryzhov	Russia
3	Jóan Símun Edmundsson	Faroe Islands
3	Artjoms Rudņevs	Latvia
3	Liviu Ganea	Romania
2	Kristoffur Jacobsen	Faroe Islands
2	Alexandru Dedov	Moldova
2	Artur Ioniţă	Moldova
2	Dmitrii Vornișel	Moldova
2	Eric Bicfalvi	Romania
2	Constantin Gângioveanu	Romania
2	Ioan Hora	Romania
2	Raul Rusescu	Romania
2	Sabrin Sburlea	Romania
2	Yevgeni Balyaikin	Russia
2	Artyom Dzyuba	Russia
2	Alan Gatagov	Russia
2	Igor Gorbatenko	Russia
2	Aleksandr Kokorin	Russia
2	Pavel Mamayev	Russia

1 goal

Andorra
- Lluis Emilio Blanco
- David Madeira
- Xavier Vieira

Faroe Islands
- Rógvi Poulsen
- Wentzel Steinarr Kamban
- Rógvi Baldvinsson

Latvia
- Romans Bespalovs
- Kaspars Dubra
- Ritvars Rugins
- Igors Tarasovs
- Daniils Turkovs
- Vadims Žuļevs

Moldova
- Dumitru Bogdan
- Artur Pătraş
- Eugen Sidorenco

Romania
- Mihai Costea
- Valerică Găman
- Andrei Ionescu
- Răzvan Ochiroşii
- Paul Papp

Russia
- Aleksei Ionov
- Anton Kozlov
- Aleksandr Salugin
- Fyodor Smolov
- Pavel Yakovlev

Own Goals

- (Latvia) Jevgenijs Kazura (for Russia)
