= 2023 Copa Constitució =

Tournament details
- Country: Andorra
- Teams: 14

Final positions
- Champions: Inter Club d'Escaldes
- Runners-up: FC Santa Coloma

Tournament statistics
- Matches played: 13
- Goals scored: 43 (3.31 per match)

The 2023 Copa Constitució was the 31st edition of the Andorran national football knockout tournament. The opening round of this edition of the cup was played on 15 January 2023.

Atlètic Club d'Escaldes were the defending champions after winning the previous final over UE Extremenya by a score of 4–1.

== Schedule ==
Round	Date(s)	Number of fixtures	Clubs
First round	15 January 2023	6	14 → 8
Quarter-finals	22 January 2023	4	8 → 4
Semi-finals	5–6 April 2023	2	4 → 2
Final	28 May 2023	1	2 → 1

== First round ==
Twelve clubs competed in the first round. The matches were played on 15 January 2023.

Team 1	Score	Team 2
CF Atlètic Amèrica (2)	3–0	UE Engordany (1)
FC Santa Coloma (1)	3–2	Carroi (1)
UE Sant Julià (1)	4–2	Encamp (1)
UE Santa Coloma (1)	0–2	Inter Club d'Escaldes (1)
Atlètic Club d'Escaldes (1)	0–3	FC Pas de la Casa (2)
La Massana (2)	0–4	Penya Encarnada d'Andorra (1)

== Quarter–finals ==
Eight clubs competed in the quarter–finals: the six winners from the first round and two clubs receiving a bye.

Team 1	Score	Team 2
UE Sant Julià (1)	0–3	Inter Club d'Escaldes (1)
CF Atlètic Amèrica (2)	0–3	FC Santa Coloma (1)
FC Ordino (1)	2–0	Penya Encarnada d'Andorra (1)
FC Rànger's (1)	0–3	FC Pas de la Casa (2)

== Semi–finals ==
The four quarter–final winners competed in the semi–finals.

Team 1	Score	Team 2
FC Pas de la Casa (2)	0–4	FC Santa Coloma (1)
Inter Club d'Escaldes (1)	1–1 (a.e.t.) (4–3 p)	Ordino (1)

== Final ==
The final was played between the winners of the semi-finals on 28 May 2023.

28 May 2023
17:00

FC Santa Coloma (1)	1–2	Inter Club d'Escaldes (1)
Gila 34'	Report	Berlanga 70'; Sascha 89'

Estadi Nacional, Andorra la Vella
Referee: Manuel Antonio Nogueira Fernandes

== See also ==
- 2022–23 Primera Divisió
- 2022–23 Segona Divisió
