= 2025 Copa Constitució =

Tournament details
- Country: Andorra
- Teams: 13

Final positions
- Champions: Inter Club d'Escaldes
- Runners-up: Atlètic Club d'Escaldes

The 2025 Copa Constitució was the 33rd edition of the Andorran national football knockout tournament. The winners qualified for the 2025–26 Conference League first qualifying round.

Inter Club d'Escaldes won the cup on 25 May 2025 (their third Copa Constitució win), defeating Atlètic Club d'Escaldes 1–0 in the final. Since they qualified for the Conference League based on league position, the spot for winning the cup was passed to the third-placed team of the 2024–25 Primera Divisió.

== First round ==
10 clubs participated in this round. 3 clubs (FC Santa Coloma, La Massana and Atlètic Amèrica) received a bye to the quarter-finals. The matches were played on 11–12 January 2025.

Team 1	Score	Team 2
11 January 2025
UE Santa Coloma (1)	5–0	City Escaldes (2)
12 January 2025
Esperança (1)	0–2	Pas de la Casa (1)
Inter Club d'Escaldes (1)	6–0	Penya Encarnada (1)
Atlètic Club d'Escaldes (1)	2–0	Ordino (1)
Rànger's (1)	1–0	Carroi (2)

== Quarter-finals ==
The five first round winners and the three clubs given first round byes entered the quarter-finals. The matches were played on 12–13 March 2025.

Team 1	Score	Team 2
12 March 2025
La Massana (1)	0–2	UE Santa Coloma (1)
Pas de la Casa (1)	0–3	Inter Club d'Escaldes (1)
13 March 2025
Atlètic Club d'Escaldes (1)	5–0	Atlètic Amèrica (2)
FC Santa Coloma (1)	1–1 (5–6 p)	Rànger's (1)

== Semi-finals ==
The four quarter-final winners entered the semi-finals. The matches were played on 16–17 April 2025.

Team 1	Score	Team 2
16 April 2025
UE Santa Coloma (1)	1–2	Inter Club d'Escaldes (1)
17 April 2025
Atlètic Club d'Escaldes (1)	2–1	Rànger's (1)

== Final ==
The final was held between the two semi-final winners and was the first official match played at the then newly-opened Estadi de la FAF.

25 May 2025
18:00

Inter Club d'Escaldes	1–0	Atlètic Club d'Escaldes

Estadi de la FAF, Encamp
Referee: Manuel Antonio Nogueira Fernandes

== See also ==
- 2024–25 Primera Divisió
- 2024–25 Segona Divisió
