= 2024–25 Primera Divisió =

2024-25 Andorran Primera Divisió season

Primera Divisió
- Season: 2024–25
- Dates: 14 September 2024 – 18 May 2025
- Champions: Inter Club d'Escaldes (4th title)
- Relegated: La Massana
- Champions League: Inter Club d'Escaldes
- Conference League: Atlètic Club d'Escaldes; FC Santa Coloma
- Matches: 90
- Goals: 284 (3.16 per match)
- Top goalscorer: Guillaume López (11 goals)
- All statistics correct as of 23 February 2025.

The 2024–25 Primera Divisió was the 30th season of top-tier football in Andorra. The season began on 14 September 2024 and ended on 18 May 2025.

== Teams ==
The league consisted of ten teams; the top eight teams from the previous season, and two teams promoted from the Segona Divisió. UE Santa Coloma entered the season as defending champions.

The promoted teams were the 2023–24 Segona Divisió champions La Massana and 2023–24 Primera Divisió play-off winners Rànger's. They replaced the Primera Divisió play-off losers Carroi and the 2023–24 Primera Divisió bottom-placed team Atlètic Amèrica.

Locations of the 2024–25 Primera Divisió teams

Club	Location
Atlètic Club d'Escaldes	Escaldes-Engordany
Esperança	Andorra la Vella
Inter Club d'Escaldes	Escaldes-Engordany
FS La Massana	La Massana
Ordino	Ordino
Pas de la Casa	El Pas de la Casa
Penya Encarnada	Andorra la Vella
FC Rànger's	Andorra la Vella
FC Santa Coloma	Santa Coloma
UE Santa Coloma	Santa Coloma

== League table ==
Pos	Team	Pld	W	D	L	GF	GA	GD	Pts	Qualification or relegation
1	Inter Club d'Escaldes (C)	27	18	8	1	84	19	+65	62	Qualification for the Champions League first qualifying round
2	Atlètic Club d'Escaldes	27	16	7	4	70	25	+45	55	Qualification for the Conference League first qualifying round (Note: The 2025 Copa Constitució winners also qualified for the Conference League first qualifying round. Since the cup winners (Inter Club d'Escaldes) qualified based on league position, the Conference League spot was passed to the third-placed team.)
3	FC Santa Coloma	27	16	4	7	42	28	+14	52	Qualification for the Conference League first qualifying round
4	UE Santa Coloma	27	14	7	6	56	24	+32	49	
5	Rànger's	27	13	9	5	59	20	+39	48	
6	Ordino	27	9	6	12	32	48	−16	33	
7	Penya Encarnada	27	9	6	12	32	46	−14	30 (Note: Penya Encarnada had three points deducted.)	
8	Pas de la Casa	27	8	5	14	35	36	−1	29	
9	Esperança (O)	27	1	4	22	14	92	−78	7	Qualification for the Primera Divisió play-off
10	La Massana (R)	27	1	2	24	10	102	−92	5	Relegation to the Segona Divisió

Source: Flashscore
Rules for classification: 1) Points; 2) Head-to-head points; 3) Head-to-head goal difference; 4) Head-to-head goals scored; 5) Goal difference; 6) Goals scored.
(C) Champions; (O) Play-off winners; (R) Relegated

== Results ==
The ten clubs play each other three times for a total of twenty-seven matches.

Home \ Away	ACE	ESP	INT	MAS	ORD	PAS	PEN	RAN	SFC	SUE	ACE	ESP	INT	MAS	ORD	PAS	PEN	RAN	SFC	SUE
Atlètic Club d'Escaldes		5–1	3–1	3–1	4–0	3–2	6–1	3–1	4–2	0–0					4–0		1–0		0–0	2–0
Esperança	0–5		0–3	1–0	2–2	0–2	1–2	0–7	0–2	0–5	0–5		0–7			0–1		1–1		0–4
Inter Club d'Escaldes	0–0	9–1		6–1	3–0	3–0	5–1	0–0	2–0	3–2	0–0			9–0			3–2		1–0	3–0
La Massana	0–6	1–1	0–6		0–3	0–4	1–3	0–4	0–4	0–6	0–4	5–0				0–5	0–0		1–4	
Ordino	2–2	3–1	0–4	2–1		2–1	0–1	2–1	0–1	0–2		1–1	0–4	5–1				0–2		1–3
Pas de la Casa	2–2	1–0	1–1	4–0	1–2		0–2	0–0	2–0	2–2	1–5		1–3		1–2			0–0	1–2	1–2
Penya Encarnada	null (Note: Match annulled and considered a loss to both teams)	4–1	1–1	2–0	0–0	1–0		0–6	0–1	2–2		4–1			1–1	1–0		0–0		
Rànger's	3–2	4–0	2–2	2–0	3–0	0–1	6–2		1–0	0–1	1–1		2–3	5–0						
FC Santa Coloma	3–1	4–0	2–2	2–0	3–1	1–0	2–1	1–1		1–1		4–0			0–1		1–0	0–5		
UE Santa Coloma	1–0	4–0	0–0	5–0	2–2	2–1	2–1	0–1	0–1					6–0			2–0	1–1	1–2	

Source: Flashscore
Legend: Blue = home team win; Yellow = draw; Red = away team win.
For upcoming matches, an "a" indicates there is an article about the rivalry between the two participants.

== Primera Divisió play-off ==
The ninth-placed club (Esperança) faced the third-placed club from the 2024–25 Segona Divisió (City Escaldes) in a two-legged play-off for the final place in the 2025–26 Primera Divisió.

=== First leg ===
24 May 2025	City Escaldes	0–2	Esperança	Les Escaldes
20:30

=== Second leg ===
28 May 2025	Esperança	w/o	City Escaldes	Andorra la Vella
20:30

== Statistics ==
=== Top scorers ===
Final standings

Rank	Player	Club	Goals
1	(France) Guillaume Lopez	Inter Club d'Escaldes	24
2	(Spain) Predrag Muñoz	Atlètic Club d'Escaldes	23
3	(Mexico) Armando León	Rànger's	20
4	(Spain) Sascha Andreu	Inter Club d'Escaldes	17
4	(Spain) Rafinha	Inter Club d'Escaldes	17
6	(Brazil) Christian	Atlètic Club d'Escaldes	16
7	(Spain) Alejandro Gómez	Atlètic Club d'Escaldes	15
7	(Morocco) Monsif	Rànger's	15
9	(Andorra) Ricard Fernández	UE Santa Coloma	13
10	(Paraguay) Franco de Jesús	UE Santa Coloma / Penya Encarnada	12
