= Abel Argañaraz =

Argentine professional footballer

Personal information
- Full name: Pablo Abel Argañaraz Paradi
- Date of birth: 21 July 1998 (age 28)
- Place of birth: San Miguel de Tucumán, Argentina
- Height: 1.74 m (5 ft 9 in)
- Position: Forward

Team information
- Current team: Gimnasia Jujuy

Youth career
- 2005–2012: Argentinos del Norte
- 2012–2013: San Martín
- 2013–2019: Lanús

Senior career*
Years	Team	Apps	(Gls)
2019	Lanús	0	(0)
2019	→ Juventud Antoniana (loan)	9	(3)
2019–2022	Central Córdoba SdE	52	(4)
2022	→ San Martín T. (loan)	8	(1)
2023	Gimnasia Jujuy	19	(4)
2023	Inter Club d'Escaldes	23	(15)
2024–2025	PSBS Biak	32	(10)
2025–2026	Paganese	0	(0)
2026–	Gimnasia Jujuy	10	(2)

International career
2015	Argentina U17	7	(0)
- * Club domestic league appearances and goals as of 17:28, 28 April 2026 (UTC)

Pablo Abel Argañaraz Paradi (born 21 July 1998) is an Argentine professional footballer who plays as a forward for Gimnasia Jujuy.

== Club career ==
Argañaraz started out at Argentinos del Norte at the age of six, remaining until the age of thirteen when he joined San Martín of San Miguel de Tucumán. In 2013, Argañaraz signed for Lanús. He finished as top scorer in his second year in their academy. In January 2019, Argañaraz was loaned to Torneo Federal A with Juventud Antoniana. He made his senior debut in a 2–0 defeat to San Martín de Formosa on 3 February. Three further appearances followed, which preceded the centre-forward scoring three goals in three matches against Crucero del Norte, Altos Hornos Zapla and Gimnasia y Tiro.

After nine matches for Juventud Antoniana, Argañaraz returned to Lanús in June 2019 but soon departed on permanent terms to newly promoted Primera División team Central Córdoba. His first appearance didn't arrive until March 2020, when he played the final thirteen minutes of a Copa de la Superliga group stage loss at home to Newell's Old Boys; having replaced Cristian Chávez. On 7 June 2022, Argañaraz joined San Martín de Tucumán on loan for the rest of the year.

== International career ==
Argañaraz represented Argentina at the 2015 South American U-17 Championship in Paraguay. He made nine appearances, though only three of which were as a starter. In 2016, he was called up to train with the U20s.

== Career statistics ==
As of 18 May 2025.

Appearances and goals by club, season and competition
Club	Season	League			Cup		League Cup		Continental		Other		Total	
Club	Season	Division	Apps	Goals	Apps	Goals	Apps	Goals	Apps	Goals	Apps	Goals	Apps	Goals
Lanús	2018–19	Primera División	0	0	0	0	0	0	—		0	0	0	0
Juventud Antoniana (loan)	2018–19	Torneo Federal A	9	3	0	0	—		—		0	0	9	3
Central Córdoba	2019–20	Primera División	0	0	0	0	1	0	—		0	0	1	0
Central Córdoba	2020–21 (Note: Soccerway counts Copa de la Liga Profesional appearances as league appearances.)	Primera División	10	2	0	0	0	0	—		0	0	10	2
Central Córdoba	2021	Primera División	29	1	0	0	0	0	—		0	0	29	1
Central Córdoba	2022	Primera División	13	1	0	0	0	0	—		0	0	13	1
Central Córdoba	Total		52	4	0	0	1	0	—		0	0	53	4
San Martín de Tucumán (loan)	2022	Primera Nacional	8	1	0	0	0	0	—		0	0	8	1
Gimnasia Jujuy	2023	Primera Nacional	19	4	0	0	0	0	—		0	0	19	4
Inter Club d'Escaldes	2023–24	Primera Divisió	23	15	0	0	0	0	—		0	0	23	15
PSBS Biak	2023–24	Primera Divisió	32	10	0	0	0	0	—		0	0	32	10
Career total			143	37	0	0	1	0	—		0	0	144	37
