= Juan José Bernales =

Chilean footballer (born 1981)

Personal information
- Full name: Juan José Bernales Segura
- Date of birth: 8 April 1981 (age 45)
- Place of birth: San Felipe, Chile
- Position: Attacking midfielder

Senior career*
Years	Team	Apps	(Gls)
- Valle del Elqui
2007–2008	Sant Julià		
2008–2009	Engordany		
2009–2012	Sant Julià		
2012–2013	Engordany	12	(0)
2015–2018	Inter d'Escaldes	9	(1)
- * Club domestic league appearances and goals

Juan José Bernales Segura (born 8 April 1981) is a Chilean former professional footballer who played as an attacking midfielder and mainly developed his career in Andorra.

== Career ==
Born in San Felipe, Chile, Bernales played for club Valle del Elqui from Vicuña in his country of birth.

He emigrated to Europe and developed his career in Andorra. In the top level, he played for both Sant Julià, coinciding with his compatriot Guillermo Burgos, and Engordany, coinciding with his compatriot Rodrigo Basualto. As a member of Sant Julià, he took part in the 2008–09 UEFA Cup and the 2009–10 UEFA Champions League.

In 2015, he joined Inter d'Escaldes after they were relegated to the second level by first time in their history and took part of the team reorganization. He stayed with them until 2018 and his last appearance was in January.

== Personal life ==
Bernales attended the Johan Cruyff Institute and got a degree in sport management. At the same time, he managed a hotel dining room.

== Honours ==
Sant Julià

- Copa Constitució: 2011
- Andorran Supercup: 2011
