= Jaime Grondona =

Chilean footballer (born 1987)

Personal information
- Full name: Jaime Andrés Grondona Bobadilla
- Date of birth: 15 April 1987 (age 39)
- Place of birth: Valparaíso, Chile
- Height: 1.80 m (5 ft 11 in)
- Position: Forward

Team information
- Current team: Kleinburg Nobleton SC (youth coach)

Youth career
- Estudiantes de Quilpué
- Everton
- Santiago Wanderers

Senior career*
Years	Team	Apps	(Gls)
2005–2007	Santiago Wanderers	19	(1)
2008–2009	Santiago Morning	22	(7)
2009–2010	O'Higgins	14	(1)
2010–2011	Deportes La Serena	24	(2)
2011	Ñublense	16	(5)
2012	Deportes Iquique	32	(3)
2013	Palestino	6	(0)
2013–2014	Cobreloa	14	(1)
2014–2015	San Marcos	8	(2)
2015–2016	San Luis	24	(5)
2017	Cobresal	10	(4)
2018	Deportes Puerto Montt	20	(4)
2019–2020	Deportes La Serena	0	(0)
2020–2021	Atlètic d'Escaldes	17	(3)
2021–2022	Santa Coloma	23	(15)
2023	Scarborough SC	12	(5)

International career
2007	Chile U20	12	(2)

Managerial career
- 2022: Santa Coloma (youth)
- 2024–: Kleinburg Nobleton SC (youth)
Medal record
Men's Football
Representing Chile
FIFA U-20 World Cup
Third place	2007 Canada	U-20 Team
- * Club domestic league appearances and goals

Jaime Andrés Grondona Bobadilla (born 15 April 1987) is a former Chilean footballer who played as a striker. He is currently a coach of Kleinburg Nobleton SC.

== Club career ==
Grondona began his professional career in the Chilean Primera División with Santiago Wanderers and made his debut on April 17, 2005. He later signed with Santiago Morning in 2008. After two seasons in the country's capital, he played for O'Higgins for two seasons. In 2011, Ñublense acquired the forward for the remainder of the 2011 season.

In the winter of 2011, he left Ñublense to sign with Deportes Iquique, where he debuted in the 2012 Copa Sudamericana. He had another run in the continental tournament in 2013 with Cobreloa.

Grondona would play the 2014–15 season with San Marcos de Arica. In 2015, he joined league rivals San Luis de Quillota. Following his brief stint with San Luis, he was transferred to C.D. Cobresal in the winter of 2017.

=== Primera B de Chile ===
In 2018, he began featuring in the Chilean second-tier league by initially signing with Deportes Puerto Montt. For the next season, he was transferred to his former club Deportes La Serena. After a season with La Serena, he was released in 2020.

=== Europe ===
In 2020, he went abroad to sign with Atlètic d'Escaldes in Andorra's Primera Divisió. His signing was recommended by former Chilean goalkeeper Guillermo Burgos, who worked in the technical staff of the club. After a season with Atlètic, he signed with league rivals Santa Coloma. In his final season in the Andorran first division, he finished as the league's top goal scorer with 15 goals.

=== Canada ===
After two seasons in Europe, he joined Canadian Soccer League club Scarborough SC in the summer of 2023. He would record his first goal for Scarborough on June 11, 2023, against Weston United. Grondona would help the eastern Toronto side secure the regular-season title. He would finish the campaign with 5 goals.

== International career ==
He was a member of the Chile national under-20 team that won third place at the 2007 FIFA U-20 World Cup in Canada. In the tournament's opening match, he contributed a goal that helped defeat Canada. He would help the national team secure the group division, which advanced the team to the next round. His next goal came in the quarterfinal round, where Chile defeated Nigeria by a score of 4–0. After his team's semifinal loss against Argentina in Toronto, Grondona was banned by FIFA for nine months over his behavior towards officials.

The Chileans would end up finishing the tournament in third place after defeating Austria. He made five appearances and scored twice at the tournament.

== Coaching career ==
Grondona began his career coaching the Santa Coloma youth ranks. He emigrated to Canada thanks to the former footballer Pablo González and spent a year making a voluntary service to the Power Soccer Academy.

On 21 March 2024, Grondona joined the coaching staff of Canadian soccer club Kleinburg Nobleton SC, whose sport manager is the Canadian-Chilean Camilo Benzi.

== Honours ==
=== Player ===
Chile

- FIFA U-20 World Cup: Third place: 2007

Scarborough SC

- Canadian Soccer League Regular Season: 2023

Individual

- Primera Divisió Top Goal Scorer: 2021–22
