= 2023–24 Primera Divisió =

Primera Divisió
- Season: 2023–24
- Dates: 16 September 2023 – 19 May 2024
- Champions: UE Santa Coloma (1st title)
- Relegated: Atlètic Amèrica; Carroi
- Champions League: UE Santa Coloma
- Conference League: Atlètic Club d'Escaldes; Inter Club d'Escaldes
- Matches: 80
- Goals: 264 (3.3 per match)
- Top goalscorer: Domi Berlanga (14 goals)
- Biggest home win: Atlètic Club d'Escaldes 8–1 Carroi (29 October 2023)
- Biggest away win: Atlètic Amèrica 1–8 Atlètic Club d'Escaldes (11 February 2024)
- Highest scoring: Atlètic Club d'Escaldes 8–1 Carroi (29 October 2023); Atlètic Amèrica 1–8 Atlètic Club d'Escaldes (11 February 2024)
- Longest winning run: 9 matches Inter Club d'Escaldes
- Longest unbeaten run: 12 matches Inter Club d'Escaldes
- Longest winless run: 12 matches Atlètic Amèrica
- Longest losing run: 10 matches Atlètic Amèrica
- All statistics correct as of 11 February 2024.

The 2023–24 Primera Divisió was the 29th season of top-tier football in Andorra. The season began on 16 September 2023 and ended on 19 May 2024.

== Participating teams ==
Locations of the 2023–24 Primera Divisió teams

Club	Location
Atlètic Club d'Escaldes	Escaldes-Engordany
Atlètic Amèrica	Escaldes-Engordany
Carroi	Escaldes-Engordany
Esperança	Andorra la Vella
Inter Club d'Escaldes	Escaldes-Engordany
Ordino	Ordino
Pas de la Casa	El Pas de la Casa
Penya Encarnada	Andorra la Vella
FC Santa Coloma	Santa Coloma
UE Santa Coloma	Santa Coloma

== Standings ==
Pos	Team	Pld	W	D	L	GF	GA	GD	Pts	Qualification or relegation
1	UE Santa Coloma (C)	27	20	6	1	57	12	+45	66	Qualification for the Champions League first qualifying round
2	Inter Club d'Escaldes	27	20	3	4	66	16	+50	63	Qualification for the Conference League first qualifying round (Note: The 2024 Copa Constitució winners also qualified for the Conference League first qualifying round. Since the cup winners (UE Santa Coloma) qualified based on league position, the Conference League spot was passed to the third-placed team.)
3	Atlètic Club d'Escaldes	27	19	3	5	71	21	+50	60	Qualification for the Conference League first qualifying round
4	FC Santa Coloma	27	19	2	6	64	23	+41	59	
5	Penya Encarnada	27	13	5	9	45	34	+11	44	
6	Ordino	27	10	6	11	33	29	+4	36	
7	Pas de la Casa	27	3	9	15	24	46	−22	18	
8	Esperança	27	4	2	21	27	81	−54	14	
9	Carroi (R)	27	3	4	20	19	77	−58	13	Qualification for the Primera Divisió play-off
10	Atlètic Amèrica (R)	27	3	2	22	22	89	−67	11	Relegation to the Segona Divisió

Source: Flashscore
Rules for classification: 1) Points; 2) Head-to-head points; 3) Head-to-head goal difference; 4) Head-to-head goals scored; 5) Goal difference; 6) Goals scored.
(C) Champions; (R) Relegated

== Results ==
The ten clubs play each other three times for a total of twenty-seven matches.

Home \ Away	ACE	AME	CAR	ESP	INT	ORD	PAS	PEN	SFC	SUE	ACE	AME	CAR	ESP	INT	ORD	PAS	PEN	SFC	SUE
Atlètic Club d'Escaldes		8–0	8–1	3–1	2–1	1–0	1–1	3–0	5–1	1–2			2–1		2–0	1–0				0–2
Atlètic Amèrica	1–4		1–3	6–3	0–3	1–2	1–3	1–1	2–4	0–1	1–8			0–5			0–3	1–4		0–1
Carroi	0–4	2–2		0–4	1–6	0–2	0–0	0–2	0–2	0–5		2–3						0–2		0–3
Esperança	0–5	2–0	0–2		0–2	0–3	0–0	0–3	0–5	0–2	1–3		2–0			2–4			0–6	
Inter Club d'Escaldes	1–0	6–0	3–1	6–0		2–0	2–0	4–2	2–0	1–1		2–0	6–0	4–0					1–2	
Ordino	1–1	1–0	4–0	4–0	2–2		1–0	1–0	1–1	1–2		1–0	1–1		0–1		1–1			
Pas de la Casa	0–2	1–2	0–1	3–2	0–3	1–1		0–1	0–5	1–5	1–2		2–2	2–2	0–1			2–2	0–2	
Penya Encarnada	1–1	6–0	4–1	1–0	0–2	2–1	2–0		0–2	1–2	1–2			3–2	1–3	2–1			2–4	0–0
FC Santa Coloma	1–0	4–0	2–1	6–1	0–1	2–0	3–2	0–1		1–2	0–1	3–0	4–0			2–0				
UE Santa Coloma	2–1	6–0	3–0	6–0	2–1	2–0	0–0	1–1	1–2					2–0	0–0	2–0	2–1		0–0	

Source: Flashscore
Legend: Blue = home team win; Yellow = draw; Red = away team win.

== Primera Divisió play-off ==
The ninth-placed club (Carroi) faced the second-placed club from the 2023–24 Segona Divisió (Rànger's) in a two-legged play-off for the final place in the following season's Primera Divisió.

=== First leg ===
25 May 2024	Rànger's	0–1	Carroi	Andorra la Vella
19:30			Saez 90' (pen.)	Stadium: Estadi Comunal d'Andorra la Vella

=== Second leg ===
29 May 2024	Carroi	0–2 (a.e.t.) (1–2 agg.)	Rànger's	Andorra la Vella
19:30			Caracuel 17'; León 114'	Stadium: Camp de Futbol d'Aixovall

== Statistics ==
=== Topscorers ===
As of 11 February 2024

Rank	Player	Club	Goals
1	(Morocco) Domi Berlanga	Inter Club d'Escaldes	14
2	(Argentina) Abel Argañaraz	Inter Club d'Escaldes	10
2	(Andorra) Guillaume López	Atlètic Club d'Escaldes	10
4	(Morocco) Karim L'Koucha	UE Santa Coloma	9
4	(Portugal) Rodrigo Piloto	Atlètic Club d'Escaldes	9
6	(Venezuela) Christian Novoa	FC Santa Coloma	8
7	(Equatorial Guinea) Salomón Obama	UE Santa Coloma	7
7	(Spain) Victor Tellado	Ordino	7
9	(Mexico) Alfonso Huerta	Pas de la Casa	6
10	(Portugal) Arzio Badjana	Carroi	5
10	(Andorra) Luis Blanco	Esperança	5
10	(Spain) Alejandro Gómez	UE Santa Coloma	5
10	(Spain) Pablo Ruiz	Ordino	5
10	(Spain) David Virgili	FC Santa Coloma	5
