= 2024–25 Segona Divisió =

Segona Divisió
- Season: 2024–25
- Champions: Carroi (1st title)
- Promoted: Carroi

The 2024–25 Segona Divisió, also known as Lliga UNIDA, was the 26th season of second-tier football in Andorra. The season began on 29 September 2024 and ended on 18 May 2025.

== Format ==
Five clubs competed for the league title. The clubs played each other four times for a total of 16 matches for each club. "B" teams could not be promoted.

== League table ==
Pos	Team	Pld	W	D	L	GF	GA	GD	Pts	Promotion or qualification
1	Carroi (C, P)	16	11	2	3	40	14	+26	35	Promotion to the Primera Divisió
2	Atlètic Amèrica	16	9	3	4	35	16	+19	30	
3	City Escaldes	16	7	2	7	30	29	+1	23	Qualification for the Primera Divisió play-off (Note: Atlètic Amèrica were refused a promotion license; the Primera Divisió play-off spot was passed to the third-placed team.)
4	UE Santa Coloma B	16	4	4	8	21	29	−8	16	
5	Rànger's B	16	3	1	12	16	54	−38	10	

Rules for classification: 1) points; 2) head-to-head points; 3) head-to-head goal difference; 4) head-to-head goals scored; 5) goal difference; 6) goals scored
(C) Champions; (P) Promoted

== Results ==
The five clubs play each other four times for a total of sixteen matches.

Home \ Away	ATL	CAR	CIT	RAN	SUE	ATL	CAR	CIT	RAN	SUE
Atlètic Amèrica		2–1	1–3	1–1	0–2		3–0	2–0	5–0	3–0
Carroi	1–1		3–1	3–1	2–0	0–1		1–0	4–1	1–0
City Escaldes	0–5	0–1		3–0	1–0	4–2	1–2		1–4	1–0
Rànger's B	1–0	0–8	1–6		0–1	1–4	1–7	1–3		2–1
UE Santa Coloma B	1–4	2–2	4–4	4–1		1–1	0–4	2–2	3–1	

Legend: Blue = home team win; Yellow = draw; Red = away team win.
For upcoming matches, an "a" indicates there is an article about the rivalry between the two participants.
