= 2026–27 UEFA Champions League =

Season of UEFA's top-tier European club football competition

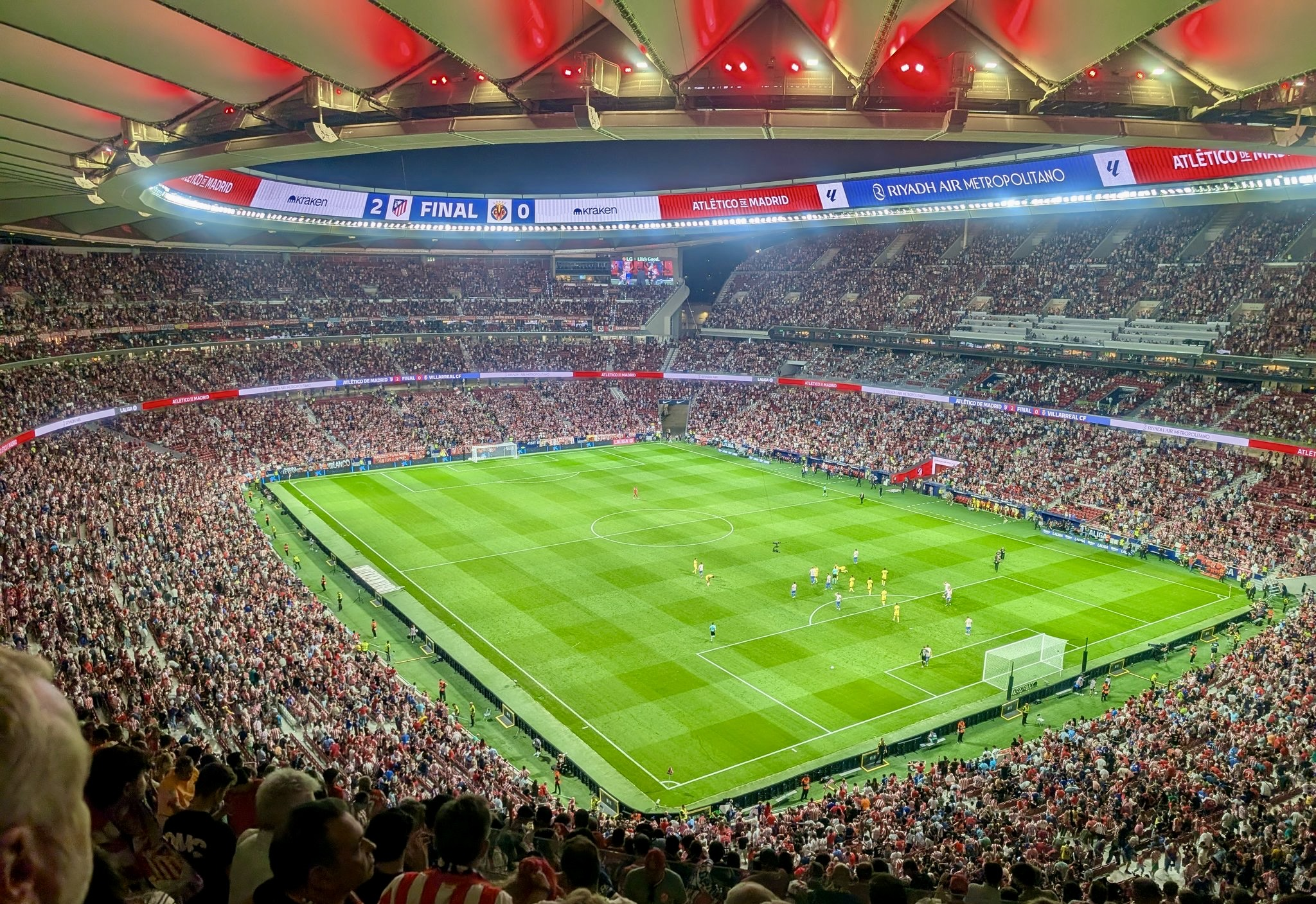
- Metropolitano Stadium in Madrid will host the final

Tournament details
- Dates: Qualifying: 7 July – 26 August 2026; Competition proper: 8 September 2026 – 5 June 2027
- Teams: Competition proper: 36; Total: 81 (from 53 associations)

Tournament statistics
- Matches played: 72
- Goals scored: 291 (4.04 per match)
- Attendance: 2,860,886 (39,735 per match)
- Top scorer(s): Anastasios Douvikas (Como); 6 goals
- All statistics correct as of 4 November 2026.

The 2026–27 UEFA Champions League is the 72nd season of Europe's premier football tournament organised by UEFA and the 35th season since it was rebranded from the European Cup to the UEFA Champions League.

The final will be held on 5 June 2027 at the Metropolitano Stadium in Madrid, Spain. It will be the second time the Metropolitano Stadium has hosted the UEFA Champions League final after 2019. The winners of the 2026–27 UEFA Champions League will automatically qualify for the 2027–28 UEFA Champions League league phase, the 2027 FIFA Intercontinental Cup final, the 2029 FIFA Club World Cup group stage and earn the right to play against the winners of the 2026–27 UEFA Europa League in the 2027 UEFA Super Cup.

Paris Saint-Germain are the two-time defending champions.

== Association team allocation ==
A total of 81 teams from 53 of the 55 UEFA member associations are participating in the 2026–27 UEFA Champions League (the exceptions being Liechtenstein which did not organise a domestic league and Russia which is currently suspended). The association ranking based on the UEFA association coefficients was used to determine the number of participating teams for each association:

- Associations 1–5 each have four teams.
- Association 6 has three teams.
- Associations 7–15 each have two teams.
- Associations 16–55 (except Russia and Liechtenstein) each have one team.
- The winners of the 2025–26 UEFA Champions League and 2025–26 UEFA Europa League were each given an additional entry if they did not qualify for the 2026–27 UEFA Champions League through their domestic league.
- The two associations with the best coefficients in the 2025–26 season each have one European Performance Spot into the league phase. The winners of the UEFA Champions League and Europa League could not fill the European Performance Spots.

=== Association ranking ===
For the 2026–27 UEFA Champions League, the associations were allocated places according to their 2025 UEFA association coefficients, which took into account their performance in European competitions from 2020–21 to 2024–25. The table reflects Russia's ongoing suspension from UEFA.

Apart from the allocation based on the association coefficients, associations could have additional teams participating in the Champions League, as noted below:

- (EPS) – European Performance Spot, the additional berths for associations who finished in the top 2 of the 2025–26 association coefficients
- (TH) – Additional berth for UEFA Champions League title holders
- (EL) – Additional berth for UEFA Europa League title holders

Association ranking for 2026–27 UEFA Champions League

Rank	Association	Coeff.	Teams	Notes
1	England	115.196	4	+1 (EPS)
2	Italy	97.231	4	
3	Spain	94.453	4	+1 (EPS)
4	Germany	86.331	4	
5	France	73.093	4	
6	Netherlands	67.150	3	
7	Portugal	62.266	2	
8	Belgium	56.850	2	
9	Czech Republic	44.100	2	
10	Turkey	43.900	2	
11	Norway	39.687	2	
12	Greece	39.312	2	
13	Austria	36.450	2	
14	Scotland	35.550	2	
15	Poland	35.000	2	
16	Denmark	33.981	1	
17	Switzerland	33.625	1	
18	Israel	31.625	1	
19	Cyprus	27.537	1	

Rank	Association	Coeff.	Teams	Notes
20	Sweden	27.125	1	
21	Croatia	27.025	1	
22	Serbia	25.500	1	
23	Ukraine	24.400	1	
24	Hungary	24.000	1	
25	Romania	23.250	1	
26	Russia	22.632	0	
27	Slovakia	21.250	1	
28	Slovenia	20.343	1	
29	Bulgaria	19.875	1	
30	Azerbaijan	19.625	1	
31	Republic of Ireland	14.968	1	
32	Moldova	14.500	1	
33	Iceland	13.520	1	
34	Bosnia and Herzegovina	13.031	1	
35	Armenia	12.250	1	
36	Latvia	12.250	1	
37	Kosovo	12.041	1	
38	Finland	11.750	1	

Rank	Association	Coeff.	Teams	Notes
39	Kazakhstan	11.125	1	
40	Faroe Islands	10.750	1	
41	Malta	8.500	1	
42	Northern Ireland	8.333	1	
43	Lithuania	8.250	1	
44	Liechtenstein	8.000	0	
45	Estonia	7.957	1	
46	Albania	7.875	1	
47	Montenegro	7.208	1	
48	Luxembourg	6.875	1	
49	Wales	6.791	1	
50	Georgia	6.625	1	
51	North Macedonia	6.166	1	
52	Belarus	6.000	1	
53	Andorra	5.498	1	
54	Gibraltar	5.457	1	
55	San Marino	2.498	1	

=== Distribution ===
		Teams entering in this round	Teams advancing from the previous round
First qualifying round (28 teams)		28 champions from associations 24–25 and 29–55 (except Russia and Liechtenstein)	
Second qualifying round (28 teams)	Champions Path (24 teams)	8 champions from associations 15–22; 2 champions from associations 27 and 28 as the teams with highest club coefficients, originally from the first qualifying round (Champions Path)	14 winners from the first qualifying round
Second qualifying round (28 teams)	League Path (4 teams)	4 runners-up from associations 10 and 13–15	
Third qualifying round (20 teams)	Champions Path (12 teams)		12 winners from the second qualifying round (Champions Path)
Third qualifying round (20 teams)	League Path (8 teams)	2 runners-up from associations 8–9; 1 third-placed team from association 6; 1 fourth-placed team from association 5; 2 runners-up from associations 11 and 12 as the teams with highest club coefficients, originally from the second qualifying round (League Path)	2 winners from the second qualifying round (League Path)
Play-off round (14 teams)	Champions Path (10 teams)	4 champions from associations 11–14	6 winners from the third qualifying round (Champions Path)
Play-off round (14 teams)	League Path (4 teams)		4 winners from the third qualifying round (League Path)
League phase (36 teams)		2 associations with the highest coefficients from the previous season receive an extra Champions League league phase berth.; 10 champions from associations 1–10; 6 runners-up from associations 1–6; 5 third-placed teams from associations 1–5; 4 fourth-placed teams from associations 1–4; 1 champion from association 23 as the team with the highest club coefficient, originally from the second qualifying round (Champions Path); 1 runner-up from association 7 as the team with the highest club coefficient, originally from the third qualifying round (League Path)	5 winners from the play-off round (Champions Path); 2 winners from the play-off round (League Path)
Knockout phase play-offs (16 teams)			16 teams ranked 9–24 from the league phase
Round of 16 (16 teams)			8 teams ranked 1–8 from the league phase; 8 winners from the knockout phase play-offs

The information here reflects the continued suspension of Russia from European football, and so the following changes to the default access list have been made:

- The champions of association 23 (Ukraine) entered the second qualifying round (Champions Path) instead of the first qualifying round.

As the Champions League title holders (Paris Saint-Germain) qualified via their domestic league's standard berth allocation, the following changes to the default access list were made:

- Shakhtar Donetsk as the domestic champions with the highest club coefficient among the clubs that would otherwise have entered the Champions Path of the qualifying phase or play-off round, entered the league phase instead of the Champions Path second qualifying round.
- Slovan Bratislava and Celje, as the two clubs with the highest club coefficient that would otherwise have entered the Champions Path first qualifying round, entered the Champions Path second qualifying round.

As the Europa League title holders (Aston Villa) qualified via their domestic league's standard berth allocation, the following changes to the default access list were made:

- Sporting CP, as the club with the highest club coefficient among all clubs that would otherwise have entered either the Champions Path or the League Path of the qualifying phase or play-off round, entered the league phase instead of the League Path third qualifying round.
- Bodø/Glimt and Olympiacos, as the two clubs with the highest club coefficient that would otherwise have entered the League Path second qualifying round, entered the League Path third qualifying round.

=== Teams ===
The labels in the parentheses show how each team qualified for the place of its starting round:

- TH: Champions League title holders
- EL: Europa League title holders
- 1st, 2nd, 3rd, 4th, etc.: League positions of the previous season
- EPS: European Performance Spots – the additional berths given to clubs from the two associations with the highest coefficient points in 2025–26

The label of European Performance Spots and title holders already qualified via league position are superscripted.

The second qualifying round, third qualifying round and play-off round are divided into Champions Path (CH) and League Path (LP).

Qualified teams for 2026–27 UEFA Champions League
Entry round		Teams			
League phase		(France) Paris Saint-Germain (1st)^{TH}	(England) Aston Villa (4th)^{EL}	(England) Arsenal (1st)	(England) Manchester City (2nd)
League phase		(England) Manchester United (3rd)	(England) Liverpool (5th)^{EPS}	(Italy) Inter Milan (1st)	(Italy) Napoli (2nd)
League phase		(Italy) Roma (3rd)	(Italy) Como (4th)	(Spain) Barcelona (1st)	(Spain) Real Madrid (2nd)
League phase		(Spain) Villarreal (3rd)	(Spain) Atlético Madrid (4th)	(Spain) Real Betis (5th)^{EPS}	(Germany) Bayern Munich (1st)
League phase		(Germany) Borussia Dortmund (2nd)	(Germany) RB Leipzig (3rd)	(Germany) VfB Stuttgart (4th)	(France) Lens (2nd)
League phase		(France) Lille (3rd)	(Netherlands) PSV Eindhoven (1st)	(Netherlands) Feyenoord (2nd)	(Portugal) Porto (1st)
League phase		(Portugal) Sporting CP (2nd)	(Belgium) Club Brugge (1st)	(Czech Republic) Slavia Prague (1st)	(Turkey) Galatasaray (1st)
League phase		(Ukraine) Shakhtar Donetsk (1st)			
Play-off round	CH	(Norway) Viking (1st)	(Greece) AEK Athens (1st)	(Austria) LASK (1st)	(Scotland) Celtic (1st)
Third qualifying round	LP	(France) Lyon (4th)	(Netherlands) NEC (3rd)	(Belgium) Union Saint-Gilloise (2nd)	(Czech Republic) Sparta Prague (2nd)
Third qualifying round	LP	(Norway) Bodø/Glimt (2nd)	(Greece) Olympiacos (2nd)		
Second qualifying round	CH	(Poland) Lech Poznań (1st)	(Denmark) AGF (1st)	(Switzerland) Thun (1st)	(Israel) Hapoel Be'er Sheva (1st)
Second qualifying round	CH	(Cyprus) Omonia (1st)	(Sweden) Mjällby AIF (1st)	(Croatia) Dinamo Zagreb (1st)	(Serbia) Red Star Belgrade (1st)
Second qualifying round	CH	(Slovakia) Slovan Bratislava (1st)	(Slovenia) Celje (1st)		
Second qualifying round	LP	(Turkey) Fenerbahçe (2nd)	(Austria) Sturm Graz (2nd)	(Scotland) Heart of Midlothian (2nd)	(Poland) Górnik Zabrze (2nd)
First qualifying round	CH	(Hungary) ETO Győr (1st)	(Romania) Universitatea Craiova (1st)	(Bulgaria) Levski Sofia (1st)	(Azerbaijan) Sabah (1st)
First qualifying round	CH	(Republic of Ireland) Shamrock Rovers (1st)	(Moldova) Petrocub Hîncești (1st)	(Iceland) Víkingur Reykjavík (1st)	(Bosnia and Herzegovina) Borac Banja Luka (1st)
First qualifying round	CH	Ararat-Armenia (1st)	(Latvia) Riga (1st)	(Kosovo) Drita (1st)	(Finland) KuPS (1st)
First qualifying round	CH	(Kazakhstan) Kairat (1st)	(Faroe Islands) KÍ (1st)	(Malta) Floriana (1st)	(Northern Ireland) Larne (1st)
First qualifying round	CH	(Lithuania) Kauno Žalgiris (1st)	(Estonia) Flora (1st)	(Albania) Egnatia (1st)	(Montenegro) Sutjeska (1st)
First qualifying round	CH	(Luxembourg) Atert Bissen (1st)	(Wales) The New Saints (1st)	(Georgia (country)) Iberia 1999 (1st)	(North Macedonia) Vardar (1st)
First qualifying round	CH	(Belarus) ML Vitebsk (1st)	(Andorra) Inter Club d'Escaldes (1st)	(Gibraltar) Lincoln Red Imps (1st)	(San Marino) Tre Fiori (1st)

1. Liechtenstein (LIE): The seven teams affiliated with the Liechtenstein Football Association (LFV) all play in the Swiss football league system. The only competition organised by the LFV is the Liechtenstein Football Cup – the winners of which qualify for the UEFA Conference League for the 2026–27 season.
2. Russia (RUS): On 28 February 2022, Russian football clubs and national teams were suspended from FIFA and UEFA competitions due to the Russian invasion of Ukraine. The tables reflect Russia's ongoing suspension from UEFA competitions.

== Schedule ==
The schedule of the competition is as follows.

Schedule for 2026–27 UEFA Champions League
Phase	Round	Draw date	First leg	Second leg
Qualifying	First qualifying round	16 June 2026	7–8 July 2026	14–15 July 2026
Qualifying	Second qualifying round	17 June 2026	21–22 July 2026	28–29 July 2026
Qualifying	Third qualifying round	20 July 2026	4–5 August 2026	11 August 2026
Play-offs	Play-off round	3 August 2026	18–19 August 2026	25–26 August 2026
League phase	Matchday 1	27 August 2026	8–10 September 2026	
League phase	Matchday 2	27 August 2026	13–14 October 2026	
League phase	Matchday 3	27 August 2026	20–21 October 2026	
League phase	Matchday 4	27 August 2026	3–4 November 2026	
League phase	Matchday 5	27 August 2026	24–25 November 2026	
League phase	Matchday 6	27 August 2026	8–9 December 2026	
League phase	Matchday 7	27 August 2026	19–20 January 2027	
League phase	Matchday 8	27 August 2026	27 January 2027	
Knockout phase	Knockout phase play-offs	29 January 2027	16–17 February 2027	23–24 February 2027
Knockout phase	Round of 16	26 February 2027	9–10 March 2027	16–17 March 2027
Knockout phase	Quarter-finals	—N/a	6–7 April 2027	13–14 April 2027
Knockout phase	Semi-finals	—N/a	27–28 April 2027	4–5 May 2027
Knockout phase	Final	—N/a	5 June 2027 at the Metropolitano Stadium, Madrid	

== Qualifying rounds ==
=== First qualifying round ===
The draw for the first qualifying round was held on 16 June 2026. The first legs were played on 7 and 8 July, and the second legs were played on 14 and 15 July 2026.

The winners of the ties advanced to the Champions Path second qualifying round. Twelve of the losing teams were transferred to the Conference League Champions Path second qualifying round, while the losers of matches 4 and 5, selected following an additional draw for rebalancing purposes, were transferred to the Conference League Champions Path third qualifying round.

First qualifying round
Team 1	Agg.	Team 2	1st leg	2nd leg
Sabah (Azerbaijan)	4–1	(Wales) The New Saints	2–0	2–1
Floriana (Malta)	3–5	(Republic of Ireland) Shamrock Rovers	2–0	1–5
Flora (Estonia)	4–5	(Georgia (country)) Iberia 1999	2–3	2–2
Lincoln Red Imps (Gibraltar)	4–2	(Andorra) Inter Club d'Escaldes	3–1	1–1
Tre Fiori (San Marino)	1–3	(Northern Ireland) Larne	0–1	1–2
Ararat-Armenia	4–3	(Latvia) Riga	2–0	2–3
Vardar (North Macedonia)	3–4	(Finland) KuPS	0–2	3–2 (a.e.t.)
Kauno Žalgiris (Lithuania)	4–3	(Kosovo) Drita	1–1	3–2
ML Vitebsk (Belarus)	1–5	(Romania) Universitatea Craiova	1–4	0–1
Petrocub Hîncești (Moldova)	2–7	(Albania) Egnatia	1–1	1–6
Borac Banja Luka (Bosnia and Herzegovina)	1–5	(Bulgaria) Levski Sofia	1–1	0–4
Víkingur Reykjavík (Iceland)	3–2	(Hungary) ETO Győr	1–0	2–2
Kairat (Kazakhstan)	4–1	(Montenegro) Sutjeska	2–1	2–0
KÍ (Faroe Islands)	4–2	(Luxembourg) Atert Bissen	2–1	2–1

=== Second qualifying round ===
The draw for the second qualifying round was held on 17 June 2026. The first legs were played on 21 and 22 July, and the second legs were played on 28 and 29 July 2026.

The winners of the ties advanced to the third qualifying round. The losers were transferred to the Europa League third qualifying round.

Second qualifying round
Team 1	Agg.	Team 2	1st leg	2nd leg
Champions Path
Mjällby AIF (Sweden)	3–0	(Gibraltar) Lincoln Red Imps	3–0	0–0
Larne (Northern Ireland)	0–9	(Serbia) Red Star Belgrade	0–4	0–5
Sabah (Azerbaijan)	3–0	(Finland) KuPS	1–0	2–0
KÍ (Faroe Islands)	0–1	(Lithuania) Kauno Žalgiris	0–0	0–1
AGF (Denmark)	5–5 (4–3 p)	(Poland) Lech Poznań	1–4	4–1 (a.e.t.)
Ararat-Armenia	3–2	(Republic of Ireland) Shamrock Rovers	2–0	1–2
Levski Sofia (Bulgaria)	3–2	(Romania) Universitatea Craiova	1–0	2–2
Omonia (Cyprus)	1–1 (5–6 p)	(Kazakhstan) Kairat	1–0	0–1 (a.e.t.)
Thun (Switzerland)	3–4	(Croatia) Dinamo Zagreb	1–1	2–3 (a.e.t.)
Víkingur Reykjavík (Iceland)	2–3	(Israel) Hapoel Be'er Sheva	2–1	0–2
Iberia 1999 (Georgia (country))	1–3	(Slovakia) Slovan Bratislava	0–2	1–1
Egnatia (Albania)	5–5 (1–4 p)	(Slovenia) Celje	3–3	2–2 (a.e.t.)
League Path
Fenerbahçe (Turkey)	2–1	(Poland) Górnik Zabrze	1–0	1–1
Sturm Graz (Austria)	6–0	(Scotland) Heart of Midlothian	4–0	2–0

=== Third qualifying round ===
The draw for the third qualifying round was held on 20 July 2026. The first legs were played on 4 and 5 August, and the second legs were played on 11 August 2026.

The winners of the ties advanced to the play-off round. The losers of the Champions Path were transferred to the Europa League play-off round, and the losers of the League Path were transferred to the Europa League league phase.

Third qualifying round
Team 1	Agg.	Team 2	1st leg	2nd leg
Champions Path
Dinamo Zagreb (Croatia)	7–1	(Lithuania) Kauno Žalgiris	5–0	2–1
Mjällby AIF (Sweden)	1–4	(Slovakia) Slovan Bratislava	1–2	0–2
Levski Sofia (Bulgaria)	2–0	(Kazakhstan) Kairat	1–0	1–0
AGF (Denmark)	2–5	(Azerbaijan) Sabah	2–1	0–4
Ararat-Armenia	2–3	(Slovenia) Celje	2–1	0–2
Hapoel Be'er Sheva (Israel)	3–0	(Serbia) Red Star Belgrade	1–0	2–0
League Path
Olympiacos (Greece)	1–2	(Netherlands) NEC	0–0	1–2 (a.e.t.)
Union Saint-Gilloise (Belgium)	5–6	(Norway) Bodø/Glimt	3–3	2–3 (a.e.t.)
Fenerbahçe (Turkey)	3–0	(Austria) Sturm Graz	2–0	1–0
Sparta Prague (Czech Republic)	2–4	(France) Lyon	2–1	0–3

== Play-off round ==
The draw for the play-off round was held on 3 August 2026. The first legs were played on 18 and 19 August, and the second legs were played on 25 and 26 August 2026.

The winners of the ties advanced to the league phase. The losers were transferred to the Europa League league phase.

Play-off round
Team 1	Agg.	Team 2	1st leg	2nd leg
Champions Path
Levski Sofia (Bulgaria)	0–4	(Greece) AEK Athens	0–0	0–4
Celtic (Scotland)	4–5	(Austria) LASK	3–0	1–5 (a.e.t.)
Dinamo Zagreb (Croatia)	3–5	(Norway) Viking	2–2	1–3
Slovan Bratislava (Slovakia)	3–2	(Slovenia) Celje	1–1	2–1 (a.e.t.)
Hapoel Be'er Sheva (Israel)	4–6	(Azerbaijan) Sabah	2–1	2–5 (a.e.t.)
League Path
Fenerbahçe (Turkey)	3–2	(France) Lyon	1–1	2–1
NEC (Netherlands)	1–6	(Norway) Bodø/Glimt	1–3	0–3

== League phase ==
Locations of Benelux and nearby teams in the 2026–27 UEFA Champions League league phase
Locations of teams in the 2026–27 UEFA Champions League league phase

Como, LASK, Sabah and Viking are making their debut appearances since the introduction of the group stage or league phase, with Sabah making their debut appearance in a major UEFA competition group or league phase and Como qualifying for European football for the first time in their history. For the first season since 1999–2000, Norway has two clubs in the Champions League main stage. Additionally, two Turkish sides qualified for the main phase for the first time since the 2007–08 season.

A total of 16 national associations are being represented in the league phase.

=== Table ===
The top eight ranked teams receive a bye directly to the round of 16. Teams ranked from 9th to 24th contest the knockout phase play-offs, with teams ranked from 9th to 16th seeded for the draw. Teams ranked from 25th to 36th are eliminated from the tournament.

Pos	Team	Pld	W	D	L	GF	GA	GD	Pts	Qualification
1	(France) Paris Saint-Germain	4	4	0	0	20	5	+15	12	Advance to round of 16 (seeded)
2	(Spain) Real Madrid	4	4	0	0	13	7	+6	12	Advance to round of 16 (seeded)
3	(England) Arsenal	4	3	1	0	8	3	+5	10	Advance to round of 16 (seeded)
4	(Italy) Como	4	3	0	1	19	6	+13	9	Advance to round of 16 (seeded)
5	(Spain) Barcelona	4	3	0	1	14	6	+8	9	Advance to round of 16 (seeded)
6	(England) Aston Villa	4	3	0	1	12	6	+6	9	Advance to round of 16 (seeded)
7	(England) Manchester City	4	3	0	1	12	7	+5	9	Advance to round of 16 (seeded)
8	(England) Liverpool	4	3	0	1	14	10	+4	9	Advance to round of 16 (seeded)
9	(Belgium) Club Brugge	4	3	0	1	11	7	+4	9	Advance to knockout phase play-offs (seeded)
10	(Portugal) Sporting CP	4	3	0	1	8	4	+4	9	Advance to knockout phase play-offs (seeded)
11	(Spain) Real Betis	4	3	0	1	8	6	+2	9	Advance to knockout phase play-offs (seeded)
12	(Germany) Borussia Dortmund	4	3	0	1	7	5	+2	9	Advance to knockout phase play-offs (seeded)
13	(Germany) Bayern Munich	4	2	2	0	12	5	+7	8	Advance to knockout phase play-offs (seeded)
14	(Germany) VfB Stuttgart	4	2	1	1	7	4	+3	7	Advance to knockout phase play-offs (seeded)
15	(Italy) Inter Milan	4	2	0	2	8	6	+2	6	Advance to knockout phase play-offs (seeded)
16	(Austria) LASK	4	2	0	2	10	9	+1	6	Advance to knockout phase play-offs (seeded)
17	(England) Manchester United	4	2	0	2	8	8	0	6	Advance to knockout phase play-offs (unseeded)
18	(Turkey) Galatasaray	4	2	0	2	8	9	−1	6	Advance to knockout phase play-offs (unseeded)
19	(Turkey) Fenerbahçe	4	1	2	1	6	11	−5	5	Advance to knockout phase play-offs (unseeded)
20	(Italy) Roma	4	1	1	2	10	8	+2	4	Advance to knockout phase play-offs (unseeded)
21	(Ukraine) Shakhtar Donetsk	4	1	1	2	4	4	0	4	Advance to knockout phase play-offs (unseeded)
22	(Norway) Viking	4	1	1	2	9	10	−1	4	Advance to knockout phase play-offs (unseeded)
23	(Spain) Atlético Madrid	4	1	1	2	4	5	−1	4	Advance to knockout phase play-offs (unseeded)
24	(Netherlands) PSV Eindhoven	4	1	1	2	3	4	−1	4	Advance to knockout phase play-offs (unseeded)
25	(Norway) Bodø/Glimt	4	1	1	2	4	9	−5	4	
26	(Portugal) Porto	4	1	0	3	6	7	−1	3	
27	(Italy) Napoli	4	1	0	3	6	11	−5	3	
28	(Spain) Villarreal	4	1	0	3	8	14	−6	3	
29	(Greece) AEK Athens	4	1	0	3	5	11	−6	3	
29	(Germany) RB Leipzig	4	1	0	3	5	11	−6	3	
31	(Azerbaijan) Sabah	4	1	0	3	4	10	−6	3	
32	(Netherlands) Feyenoord	4	1	0	3	4	11	−7	3	
33	(France) Lens	4	1	0	3	4	16	−12	3	
34	(Czech Republic) Slavia Prague	4	0	1	3	5	9	−4	1	
35	(France) Lille	4	0	1	3	4	10	−6	1	
36	(Slovakia) Slovan Bratislava	4	0	0	4	1	17	−16	0	

Updated to match(es) played on 5 November 2026. Source: UEFA
Rules for classification: League phase tiebreakers

=== Results ===
Matchday 1
Home team	Score	Away team
AEK Athens (Greece)	1–0	(Austria) LASK
Club Brugge (Belgium)	2–3	(England) Aston Villa
Borussia Dortmund (Germany)	3–2	(Spain) Villarreal
Porto (Portugal)	0–2	(England) Manchester City
Lille (France)	2–3	(Spain) Real Betis
Real Madrid (Spain)	2–1	(Italy) Inter Milan
Barcelona (Spain)	5–1	(Netherlands) Feyenoord
VfB Stuttgart (Germany)	3–1	(Norway) Viking
Liverpool (England)	2–1	(Spain) Atlético Madrid
Paris Saint-Germain (France)	6–1	(Slovakia) Slovan Bratislava
Sporting CP (Portugal)	3–1	(Turkey) Galatasaray
Napoli (Italy)	0–1	(England) Arsenal
Fenerbahçe (Turkey)	1–1	(Italy) Roma
PSV Eindhoven (Netherlands)	1–1	(Ukraine) Shakhtar Donetsk
Como (Italy)	4–1	(Germany) RB Leipzig
Bayern Munich (Germany)	5–0	(Norway) Bodø/Glimt
Manchester United (England)	4–0	(Azerbaijan) Sabah
Slavia Prague (Czech Republic)	2–3	(France) Lens

Matchday 2
Home team	Score	Away team
Lens (France)	0–2	(Portugal) Sporting CP
Sabah (Azerbaijan)	2–0	(Czech Republic) Slavia Prague
Arsenal (England)	3–0	(France) Lille
Atlético Madrid (Spain)	2–0	(England) Manchester United
Inter Milan (Italy)	3–4	(Belgium) Club Brugge
Galatasaray (Turkey)	1–4	(Spain) Barcelona
RB Leipzig (Germany)	1–0	(Netherlands) PSV Eindhoven
Viking (Norway)	3–3	(Germany) Bayern Munich
Villarreal (Spain)	3–1	(Italy) Napoli
Feyenoord (Netherlands)	3–2	(Italy) Como
LASK (Austria)	3–6	(England) Liverpool
Roma (Italy)	3–4	(Spain) Real Madrid
Aston Villa (England)	6–0	(Turkey) Fenerbahçe
Shakhtar Donetsk (Ukraine)	3–1	(Greece) AEK Athens
Bodø/Glimt (Norway)	1–0	(Germany) Borussia Dortmund
Manchester City (England)	2–4	(France) Paris Saint-Germain
Real Betis (Spain)	3–2	(Portugal) Porto
Slovan Bratislava (Slovakia)	0–3	(Germany) VfB Stuttgart

Matchday 3
Home team	Score	Away team
Fenerbahçe (Turkey)	2–2	(Czech Republic) Slavia Prague
Sabah (Azerbaijan)	1–2	(Germany) Borussia Dortmund
Roma (Italy)	4–0	(Slovakia) Slovan Bratislava
Porto (Portugal)	0–1	(Netherlands) PSV Eindhoven
Liverpool (England)	4–3	(Spain) Villarreal
Manchester City (England)	5–1	(Greece) AEK Athens
Paris Saint-Germain (France)	4–2	(Spain) Barcelona
Napoli (Italy)	4–3	(Norway) Bodø/Glimt
VfB Stuttgart (Germany)	1–1	(Spain) Atlético Madrid
Como (Italy)	4–1	(England) Manchester United
Lille (France)	2–4	(Turkey) Galatasaray
Aston Villa (England)	3–1	(Norway) Viking
Club Brugge (Belgium)	3–0	(France) Lens
Bayern Munich (Germany)	2–2	(England) Arsenal
Inter Milan (Italy)	1–0	(Ukraine) Shakhtar Donetsk
Real Madrid (Spain)	4–1	(Germany) RB Leipzig
Real Betis (Spain)	1–0	(Netherlands) Feyenoord
Sporting CP (Portugal)	2–3	(Austria) LASK

Matchday 4
Home team	Score	Away team
Shakhtar Donetsk (Ukraine)	0–1	(Portugal) Sporting CP
Galatasaray (Turkey)	2–0	(Germany) VfB Stuttgart
Atlético Madrid (Spain)	0–2	(Germany) Bayern Munich
Barcelona (Spain)	3–0	(England) Aston Villa
Feyenoord (Netherlands)	0–3	(Italy) Inter Milan
Bodø/Glimt (Norway)	0–0	(France) Lille
LASK (Austria)	4–0	(Slovakia) Slovan Bratislava
Manchester United (England)	3–2	(Italy) Roma
Villarreal (Spain)	0–6	(France) Paris Saint-Germain
AEK Athens (Greece)	2–3	(Spain) Real Madrid
Fenerbahçe (Turkey)	3–2	(England) Liverpool
Borussia Dortmund (Germany)	2–1	(Spain) Real Betis
Porto (Portugal)	4–1	(Italy) Napoli
PSV Eindhoven (Netherlands)	1–2	(Belgium) Club Brugge
RB Leipzig (Germany)	2–3	(England) Manchester City
Lens (France)	1–9	(Italy) Como
Slavia Prague (Czech Republic)	1–2	(England) Arsenal
Viking (Norway)	4–1	(Azerbaijan) Sabah

Matchday 5
Home team	Score	Away team
Bodø/Glimt (Norway)	24 Nov	(Austria) LASK
Galatasaray (Turkey)	24 Nov	(England) Aston Villa
Arsenal (England)	24 Nov	(Germany) Borussia Dortmund
Como (Italy)	24 Nov	(Greece) AEK Athens
Feyenoord (Netherlands)	24 Nov	(Portugal) Porto
Manchester City (England)	24 Nov	(Italy) Napoli
RB Leipzig (Germany)	24 Nov	(France) Lens
Real Madrid (Spain)	24 Nov	(Netherlands) PSV Eindhoven
Slovan Bratislava (Slovakia)	24 Nov	(Spain) Real Betis
Sabah (Azerbaijan)	25 Nov	(Spain) Barcelona
Slavia Prague (Czech Republic)	25 Nov	(Spain) Villarreal
Atlético Madrid (Spain)	25 Nov	(Norway) Viking
Club Brugge (Belgium)	25 Nov	(England) Liverpool
Inter Milan (Italy)	25 Nov	(Germany) VfB Stuttgart
Shakhtar Donetsk (Ukraine)	25 Nov	(Turkey) Fenerbahçe
Lille (France)	25 Nov	(Germany) Bayern Munich
Paris Saint-Germain (France)	25 Nov	(Italy) Roma
Sporting CP (Portugal)	25 Nov	(England) Manchester United

Matchday 6
Home team	Score	Away team
Viking (Norway)	8 Dec	(Netherlands) Feyenoord
Villarreal (Spain)	8 Dec	(Azerbaijan) Sabah
AEK Athens (Greece)	8 Dec	(Turkey) Galatasaray
Roma (Italy)	8 Dec	(Portugal) Sporting CP
Aston Villa (England)	8 Dec	(France) Paris Saint-Germain
Barcelona (Spain)	8 Dec	(England) Manchester City
Bayern Munich (Germany)	8 Dec	(Czech Republic) Slavia Prague
Manchester United (England)	8 Dec	(Germany) RB Leipzig
Napoli (Italy)	8 Dec	(Belgium) Club Brugge
Real Betis (Spain)	9 Dec	(Italy) Como
Slovan Bratislava (Slovakia)	9 Dec	(Ukraine) Shakhtar Donetsk
Arsenal (England)	9 Dec	(Spain) Real Madrid
Borussia Dortmund (Germany)	9 Dec	(Italy) Inter Milan
LASK (Austria)	9 Dec	(Turkey) Fenerbahçe
Liverpool (England)	9 Dec	(Portugal) Porto
PSV Eindhoven (Netherlands)	9 Dec	(Spain) Atlético Madrid
Lens (France)	9 Dec	(Norway) Bodø/Glimt
VfB Stuttgart (Germany)	9 Dec	(France) Lille

Matchday 7
Home team	Score	Away team
Bodø/Glimt (Norway)	19 Jan	(Spain) Atlético Madrid
Galatasaray (Turkey)	19 Jan	(Netherlands) Feyenoord
AEK Athens (Greece)	19 Jan	(Italy) Roma
Aston Villa (England)	19 Jan	(Germany) Borussia Dortmund
Inter Milan (Italy)	19 Jan	(England) Liverpool
Porto (Portugal)	19 Jan	(Czech Republic) Slavia Prague
Lille (France)	19 Jan	(Slovakia) Slovan Bratislava
Real Madrid (Spain)	19 Jan	(Austria) LASK
VfB Stuttgart (Germany)	19 Jan	(Belgium) Club Brugge
Fenerbahçe (Turkey)	20 Jan	(Spain) Villarreal
Sabah (Azerbaijan)	20 Jan	(Italy) Napoli
Como (Italy)	20 Jan	(France) Paris Saint-Germain
Manchester United (England)	20 Jan	(Germany) Bayern Munich
RB Leipzig (Germany)	20 Jan	(Ukraine) Shakhtar Donetsk
Lens (France)	20 Jan	(England) Manchester City
Real Betis (Spain)	20 Jan	(England) Arsenal
Sporting CP (Portugal)	20 Jan	(Spain) Barcelona
Viking (Norway)	20 Jan	(Netherlands) PSV Eindhoven

Matchday 8
Home team	Score	Away team
Arsenal (England)	27 Jan	(Azerbaijan) Sabah
Roma (Italy)	27 Jan	(France) Lille
Atlético Madrid (Spain)	27 Jan	(Turkey) Fenerbahçe
Borussia Dortmund (Germany)	27 Jan	(Greece) AEK Athens
Club Brugge (Belgium)	27 Jan	(Norway) Bodø/Glimt
Bayern Munich (Germany)	27 Jan	(Spain) Real Betis
Barcelona (Spain)	27 Jan	(Italy) Como
Shakhtar Donetsk (Ukraine)	27 Jan	(Spain) Real Madrid
Feyenoord (Netherlands)	27 Jan	(Germany) RB Leipzig
LASK (Austria)	27 Jan	(Portugal) Porto
Liverpool (England)	27 Jan	(France) Lens
Manchester City (England)	27 Jan	(Portugal) Sporting CP
Paris Saint-Germain (France)	27 Jan	(Turkey) Galatasaray
PSV Eindhoven (Netherlands)	27 Jan	(Germany) VfB Stuttgart
Slavia Prague (Czech Republic)	27 Jan	(England) Aston Villa
Napoli (Italy)	27 Jan	(Norway) Viking
Villarreal (Spain)	27 Jan	(England) Manchester United
Slovan Bratislava (Slovakia)	27 Jan	(Italy) Inter Milan

== Statistics ==
Statistics exclude qualifying rounds and play-off round.

Table correct as of 4 November 2026.

=== Top goalscorers ===
Rank	Player	Team	Goals	Minutes played
1	(Greece) Anastasios Douvikas	(Italy) Como	6	246
2	(Norway) Erling Haaland	(England) Manchester City	5	270
2	(Germany) Nicolò Tresoldi	(Belgium) Club Brugge	5	336
4	(Bosnia and Herzegovina) Ermedin Demirović	(Germany) VfB Stuttgart	4	164
4	(Brazil) Raphinha	(Spain) Barcelona	4	201
4	(Guinea) Serhou Guirassy	(Germany) Borussia Dortmund	4	244
4	(Russia) Aleksey Batrakov	(Turkey) Galatasaray	4	284
4	(Netherlands) Donyell Malen	(Italy) Roma	4	314
4	(Colombia) Luis Suárez	(Portugal) Sporting CP	4	339
4	(Spain) Fabián Ruiz	(France) Paris Saint-Germain	4	354
4	(France) Kylian Mbappé	(Spain) Real Madrid	4	357
4	(England) Harry Kane	(Germany) Bayern Munich	4	360

== See also ==
- 2026–27 UEFA Europa League
- 2026–27 UEFA Conference League
- 2026–27 UEFA Women's Champions League
- 2026–27 UEFA Women's Europa Cup
- 2026–27 UEFA Youth League
