= 2021–22 Primera Divisió =

Primera Divisió
- Season: 2021–22
- Dates: 19 September 2021 – 22 May 2022
- Champions: Inter Club d'Escaldes; 3rd title
- Relegated: Carroi
- Champions League: Inter Club d'Escaldes
- Europa Conference League: UE Santa Coloma; Atlètic Club d'Escaldes
- Matches: 108
- Goals: 321 (2.97 per match)
- Top goalscorer: Jaime Grondona; Guillaume Lopez (14 goals each)
- Biggest home win: Inter Club d'Escaldes 3–0 Engordany (17 October 2021); Inter Club d'Escaldes 3–0 Ordino (21 November 2021); FC Santa Coloma 3–0 Carroi (19 December 2021); Atlètic Club d'Escaldes 3–0 Ordino (19 December 2021); Inter Club d'Escaldes 4–1 Engordany (6 March 2022); Sant Julià 4–1 Carroi (6 March 2022)
- Biggest away win: Ordino 0–7 Inter Club d'Escaldes (13 February 2022)
- Highest scoring: Carroi 2–5 FC Santa Coloma (3 October 2021); Ordino 0–7 Inter Club d'Escaldes (13 February 2022)
- Longest winning run: 5 matches Atlètic Club d'Escaldes
- Longest unbeaten run: 11 matches Inter Club d'Escaldes; Sant Julià
- Longest winless run: 13 matches Carroi
- Longest losing run: 13 matches Carroi
- All statistics correct as of 24 April 2022.

The 2021–22 Primera Divisió was the 27th season of top-tier football in Andorra. The season began on 19 September 2021. The league champion qualified to compete in the 2022–23 UEFA Champions League.

Inter Club d'Escaldes were the defending Primera Divisió champions.

== Teams ==
Penya Encarnada were relegated from the Primera Divisió after finishing in last place the previous season. Ordino were promoted to the Primera Divisió having won the previous season's Segona Divisió title.

== Regular season ==
=== League table ===
Pos	Team	Pld	W	D	L	GF	GA	GD	Pts	Qualification
1	Inter Club d'Escaldes	21	12	6	3	42	15	+27	42	Qualification for the Championship round
2	UE Santa Coloma	21	11	6	4	29	19	+10	39	Qualification for the Championship round
3	Sant Julià	21	10	7	4	33	21	+12	37	Qualification for the Championship round
4	Atlètic Club d'Escaldes	21	10	7	4	36	19	+17	37	Qualification for the Championship round
5	FC Santa Coloma	21	10	7	4	41	26	+15	37	Qualification for the Relegation round
6	Ordino	21	5	4	12	19	39	−20	19	Qualification for the Relegation round
7	Engordany	21	4	5	12	23	37	−14	17	Qualification for the Relegation round
8	Carroi	21	1	0	20	15	62	−47	3	Qualification for the Relegation round

Source: Soccerway.com
Rules for classification: 1) Points; 2) Head-to-head points; 3) Head-to-head goal difference; 4) Head-to-head goals scored; 5) Goal difference; 6) Goals scored.

=== Results ===
The eight clubs played each other three times for a total of twenty-one matches each in the regular season.

Home \ Away	ACE	CAR	ENG	INT	ORD	SJU	SFC	SUE	ACE	CAR	ENG	INT	ORD	SJU	SFC	SUE
Atlètic Club d'Escaldes		3–1	3–1	1–1	3–0	1–1	2–1	0–0		2–1				2–3		1–1
Carroi	1–2		1–4	0–2	1–5	0–6	2–5	1–2				0–2	0–1		0–5	1–3
Engordany	0–2	3–1		1–2	2–4	1–1	2–4	1–1	1–0	1–0			0–0	1–3		
Inter Club d'Escaldes	0–0	4–2	3–0		3–0	1–0	1–1	2–2	2–1		4–1				1–2	
Ordino	1–1	2–0	1–0	0–4		0–1	0–0	0–2	0–5			0–7		1–2		0–1
Sant Julià	1–0	2–0	3–2	0–0	1–1		0–0	1–2		4–1		0–0				0–4
FC Santa Coloma	1–3	3–0	1–1	3–2	3–2	1–3		3–1	1–1		1–1		2–1	2–0		
UE Santa Coloma	1–3	1–2	1–0	0–1	1–0	1–1	2–1				1–0	1–0			1–1	

Source: Soccerway.com
Legend: Blue = home team win; Yellow = draw; Red = away team win.

== Championship and relegation rounds ==
Regular season records are carried over to championship and relegation rounds.

=== Championship round ===
Pos	Team	Pld	W	D	L	GF	GA	GD	Pts	Qualification	INT	SUE	SJU	ACE
1	Inter Club d'Escaldes (C)	27	14	8	5	54	24	+30	50	Qualification for the Champions League preliminary round		1–3	4–1	4–1
2	UE Santa Coloma	27	13	8	6	37	26	+11	47	Qualification for the Europa Conference League first qualifying round	1–0		0–0	1–1
3	Sant Julià	27	12	10	5	41	30	+11	46		2–2	2–1		1–1
4	Atlètic Club d'Escaldes	27	11	10	6	44	30	+14	43	Qualification for the Europa Conference League first qualifying round (Note: Atlètic Club d'Escaldes qualified for the Europa Conference League as the Copa Constitució winners.)	1–1	3–2	1–2	

Source: Soccerway.com
Legend: Blue = home team win; Yellow = draw; Red = away team win.
Rules for classification: 1) Points; 2) Head-to-head points; 3) Head-to-head goal difference; 4) Head-to-head goals scored; 5) Goal difference; 6) Goals scored.
(C) Champions

=== Relegation round ===
Pos	Team	Pld	W	D	L	GF	GA	GD	Pts	Relegation	SFC	ORD	ENG	CAR
5	FC Santa Coloma	27	15	7	5	64	34	+30	52			3–2	8–1	1–2
6	Ordino	27	7	6	14	30	49	−19	27		2–3		2–1	2–2
7	Engordany (O)	27	5	5	17	29	55	−26	20	Qualification for the relegation play-offs	1–4	0–2		1–2
8	Carroi (R)	27	3	2	22	22	73	−51	11	Relegation to the Segona Divisió	0–4	1–1	0–2	

Source: Soccerway.com
Legend: Blue = home team win; Yellow = draw; Red = away team win.
Rules for classification: 1) Points; 2) Head-to-head points; 3) Head-to-head goal difference; 4) Head-to-head goals scored; 5) Goal difference; 6) Goals scored.
(O) Play-off winners; (R) Relegated

== Primera Divisió play-offs ==
The seventh-placed team, third-placed in the relegation round, from the Primera Divisió and the runners-up from the Segona Divisió played a play-off over two legs for a place in the 2022–23 Primera Divisió.

29 May 2022	La Massana	0–3	Engordany
20:00			Nájera 4'; Marcel 10'; Assane 78'

1 June 2022	Engordany	4–1 (7–1 agg.)	La Massana
20:30	Marcel 25', 90+2'; Minutella 27'; Mirabaje 51'		Leighton 79'

== Statistics ==
=== Top scorers ===
As of 24 April 2022

Rank	Player	Club	Goals
1	(Chile) Jaime Grondona	FC Santa Coloma	14
1	(France) Guillaume Lopez	FC Santa Coloma	14
3	(Spain) Gerard Artigas	Inter Club d'Escaldes	11
4	(Spain) David Corominas	UE Santa Coloma	10
5	(The Gambia) Bacari	Sant Julià	7
5	(Spain) Aleix Cisteró	Atlètic Club d'Escaldes	7
5	(Argentina) Ramiro Maldonado	Sant Julià	7
8	(Spain) Joel Leones Paredes	Inter Club d'Escaldes	6
9	(Morocco) Ahmed Belhadji	Inter Club d'Escaldes	5
9	(Spain) Abraham Gómez	Atlètic Club d'Escaldes	5
9	(Spain) Rober	Carroi	5
9	(Mexico) Diego Nájera	Engordany	5
9	(Equatorial Guinea) Salomón Obama	UE Santa Coloma	5
9	(Spain) Xavi Puerto	FC Santa Coloma	5
9	(Spain) Genís Soldevila	Atlètic Club d'Escaldes	5

== See also ==
- Segona Divisió
- Copa Constitució
