= Anton Kozlov =

Russian footballer

Personal information
- Full name: Anton Sergeyevich Kozlov
- Date of birth: 2 June 1988 (age 38)
- Place of birth: Bratsk, Russian SFSR
- Height: 1.79 m (5 ft 10 1/2 in)
- Position: Midfielder

Youth career
- UOR Master-Saturn Yegoryevsk

Senior career*
Years	Team	Apps	(Gls)
2006–2010	FC Saturn Ramenskoye	0	(0)
2009	→ FC Nizhny Novgorod (loan)	32	(4)
2010	→ FC Avangard Kursk (loan)	11	(0)
2010	→ FC Khimki (loan)	8	(0)
2011	FC Tom Tomsk	0	(0)
2011–2012	FC Baltika Kaliningrad	18	(1)
2012	FC Sibiryak Bratsk	9	(0)
2013	FC Luch-Energiya Vladivostok	5	(0)
2014	FC Sever Murmansk	8	(1)
2014	FC Dynamo Saint Petersburg	10	(0)
2015	FC Saturn Ramenskoye	4	(0)
2015	FC Mika	7	(1)
2016	FC DSI Komsomolsk-na-Amure		
2017	FC Rassvet-Restavratsiya Krasnoyarsk		

International career
2009	Russia U21	3	(2)
- * Club domestic league appearances and goals

Anton Sergeyevich Kozlov (Russian: Антон Серге́евич Козлов; born 2 June 1988) is a Russian former professional football player.

== Club career ==
He played for the main squad of FC Saturn Ramenskoye in the Russian Cup and UEFA Intertoto Cup 2008.

He played 6 seasons in the Russian Football National League for 6 different teams.

== International career ==
Kozlov was a part of the Russia U21 side that was competing in the 2011 European Under-21 Championship qualification.
