= Xavier Vieira =

Andorran footballer

Personal information
- Full name: Xavier Vieira de Vasconcelos
- Date of birth: January 14, 1992 (age 34)
- Place of birth: Andorra la Vella, Andorra
- Position: Midfielder

Team information
- Current team: Pas de la Casa
- Number: 8

Senior career*
Years	Team	Apps	(Gls)
2008–2010	FC Andorra	4	(0)
2010–2014	Atlético Monzón	0	(0)
2014–2015	FC Andorra	3	(0)
2016–2017	Encamp	18	(6)
2017–2018	Lusitanos	31	(3)
2019–2022	Atlètic d'Escaldes	74	(8)
2022–2023	Engordany	20	(0)
2023	Ordino	2	(0)
2024–	Pas de la Casa	12	(0)

International career^{‡}
2013–	Andorra	12	(0)
- * Club domestic league appearances and goals as of 27 May 2024 ‡ National team caps and goals as of 25 March 2024

Xavier Vieira de Vasconcelos (born 14 January 1992) is an Andorran footballer who plays for Pas de la Casa and who has represented the Andorra national football team.

== International career ==
Vieira played his first international game with the national team on 15 October 2013, in a friendly against Hungary where he came in as a substitute for Edu Peppe after 80 minutes.
