= Kristoffur Jakobsen =

Faroese footballer

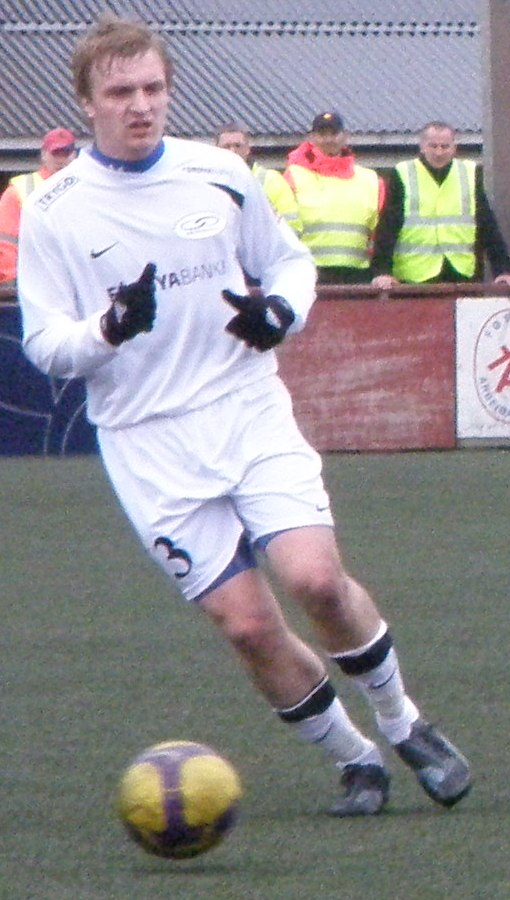
- Jakobsen while playing for EB/Streymur

Personal information
- Date of birth: 7 November 1988 (age 37)
- Place of birth: Faroe Islands
- Height: 1.82 m (5 ft 11 1/2 in)
- Positions: Midfielder; forward

Team information
- Current team: KÍ Klaksvík

Senior career*
Years	Team	Apps	(Gls)
2005–2009	KÍ Klaksvík	125	(13)
2010	EB/Streymur	19	(1)
2011–2013	KÍ Klaksvík	74	(19)
2014–2018	ÍF Fuglafjørður	48	(6)
2018–	KÍ Klaksvík		

International career^{‡}
2003–2004	Faroe Islands U17	14	(1)
2005–2006	Faroe Islands U19	5	(0)
2007–2010	Faroe Islands U21	16	(2)
2008–	Faroe Islands	1	(0)
- * Club domestic league appearances and goals as of 25 November 2015 ‡ National team caps and goals as of 25 November 2015

Kristoffur Jakobsen (born 7 November 1988) is a Faroese footballer who plays for ÍF Fuglafjørður in the Faroe Islands Premier League. He has one cap for the Faroe Islands and he had previously played at junior level for his country.

== Club career ==
Following the completion of the 2013 season Jakobsen signed for ÍF Fuglafjørður.

== International career ==
Kristoffur made his debut for the Faroe Islands in the friendly match against Iceland, in 2008. He hasn't made any official appearances since and was last called up to the squad in February 2012 as a late call-up for a training camp held in Spain.
