= Diego Nájera =

Mexican footballer (born 1994)

Personal information
- Full name: Diego Alejandro Nájera Quintero
- Date of birth: December 11, 1994 (age 31)
- Place of birth: Guadalajara, Mexico
- Height: 1.78 m (5 ft 10 in)
- Position: Striker

Senior career*
Years	Team	Apps	(Gls)
–2013	Tecos FC		
2015–2016	Penya Encarnada d'Andorra	22	(5)
2016–2017	FC Encamp	28	(9)
2017–2018	UE Sant Julià	31	(3)
2018–2021	FC Santa Coloma	86	(10)
2021–2023	UE Engordany	50	(0)
2023–2025	CF Esperança d'Andorra	25	(4)
2025	Penya Encarnada d'Andorra	13	(1)
2026–	CF Esperança d'Andorra	18	(2)
- * Club domestic league appearances and goals as of 15 June 2026

Diego Alejandro Nájera Quintero (born 11 December 1994) is a Mexican footballer who plays as a striker for CF Esperança d'Andorra.

== Early life ==
He joined the youth academy of Mexican side Tecos FC at the age of eight. He is a native of Guadalajara, Mexico.

== Club career ==
He started his career with Mexican side Tecos. He debuted for the club at the age of seventeen. In 2015, he signed for Andorran side Penya Encarnada d'Andorra. In 2016, he signed for Andorran side Encamp. In 2017, he signed for Andorran side UE Sant Julià. In 2018, he signed for Andorran side Santa Coloma. He played for the club in the UEFA Champion's League and UEFA Europa League. In 2021, he signed for Andorran side Engordany. In 2023, he signed for Andorran side CF Esperança d'Andorra.

== International career ==
He was considered to be naturalized to play for the Andorra national football team. He is also eligible to represent Mexico internationally, having been born in the country.
