= Luis Blanco (footballer, born 1990) =

Andorran footballer

Personal information
- Full name: Luis Emilio Blanco Coto
- Date of birth: 15 January 1990 (age 36)
- Place of birth: Barcelona, Spain
- Height: 1.83 m (6 ft 0 in)
- Position: Midfielder

Team information
- Current team: Esperança
- Number: 10

Senior career*
Years	Team	Apps	(Gls)
2010–2011	Barceloneta		
2011–2012	Turó Peira		
2012–2013	Carmelo		
2013–2014	FC Santa Coloma	6	(0)
2014–2019	Sant Julià	93	(19)
2019–2022	FC Santa Coloma	55	(6)
2022–2023	Engordany	23	(1)
2023–	Esperança	41	(10)

International career^{‡}
2004–2006	Andorra U17	4	(0)
2007–2008	Andorra U19	3	(0)
2010–2012	Andorra U21	6	(1)
2020–	Andorra	6	(0)
- * Club domestic league appearances and goals as of 18 May 2025 ‡ National team caps and goals as of 13 October 2024

Luis Emilio Blanco Coto (born 15 January 1990) is an Andorran footballer who plays as a midfielder for Esperança and the Andorra national team.

== Career ==
Blanco made his international debut for Andorra on 6 September 2020 in the UEFA Nations League against the Faroe Islands, which finished as a 0–1 home loss.

== Career statistics ==
=== International ===
As of 6 September 2020

Andorra
Year	Apps	Goals
2020	1	0
Total	1	0
