= Casa de Portugal =

Casa de Portugal may refer to:

- Casa de Portugal in São Paulo, association of Portuguese migrants in São Paulo, Brazil
- Casa de Portugal em Macau, football club in Macau
- CE Casa de Portugal, football club in Andorra
