= Guillermo Burgos =

Chilean footballer and manager (born 1977)

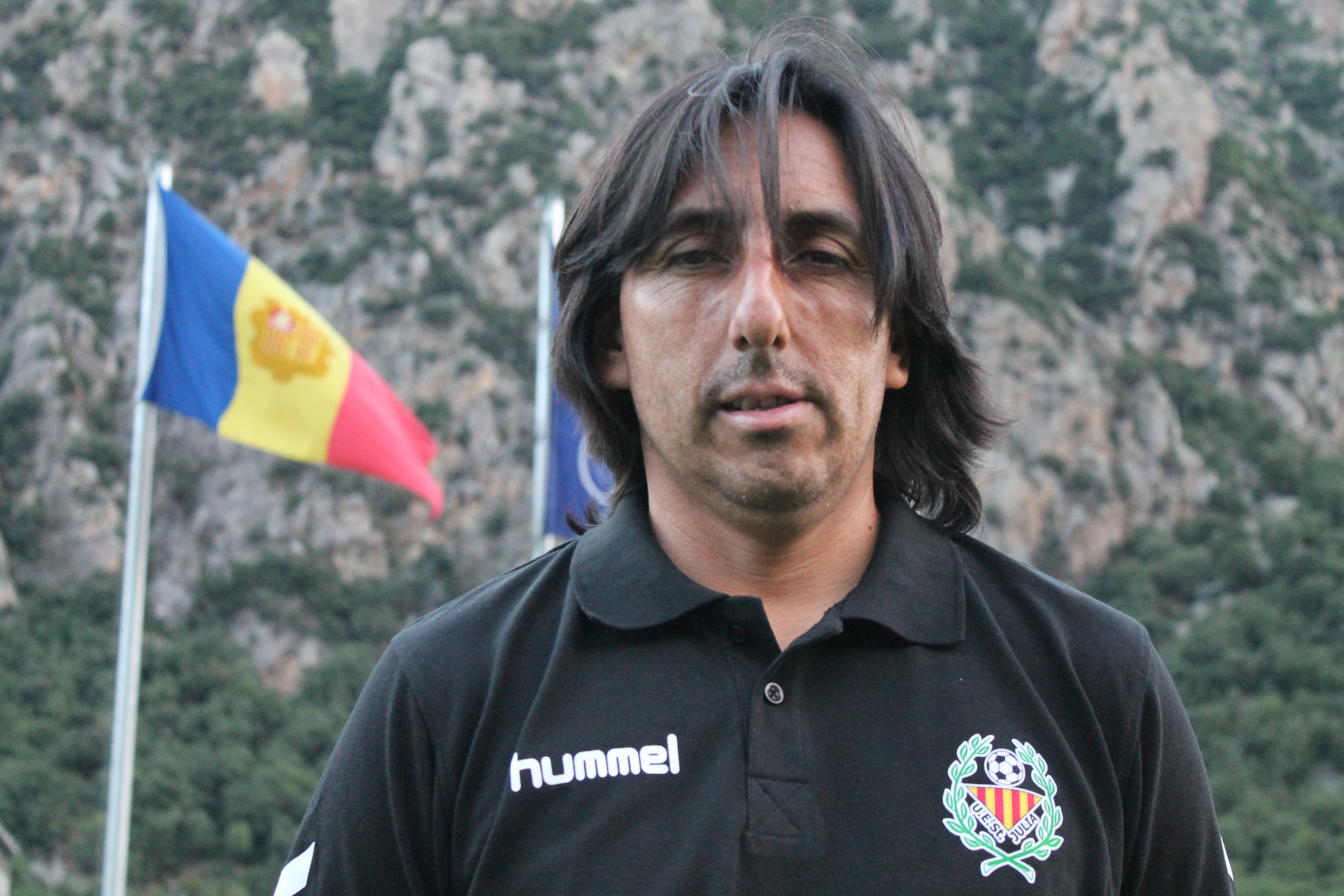
- Burgos in 2017

Personal information
- Full name: Guillermo José Burgos Viguera
- Date of birth: 19 August 1977 (age 49)
- Place of birth: Temuco, Chile
- Height: 1.75 m (5 ft 9 in)
- Position: Goalkeeper

Senior career*
| Years | Team | Apps | (Gls) |
- Campos Deportivos
- University of La Frontera
| 2003–2004 | UE Sant Julià | | |
| 2004 | FC Andorra | | |
| 2005–2010 | UE Sant Julià | | |
| 2011 | CE Principat | | |
| 2011–2013 | FC Santa Coloma | | |

Managerial career
- 2005–2007: UE Sant Julià (youth)
- 2005–2007: UE Sant Julià (women)
- 2007: Andorra (assistant)
- * Club domestic league appearances and goals

Guillermo José Burgos Viguera (born 19 August 1977) is a Chilean former professional footballer who played as a goalkeeper.

== Playing career ==
Born in Temuco, Chile, Burgos played football at amateur level for Club Campos Deportivos and the University of La Frontera team in his country of birth. In 2002, he went to Andorra to visit a sister and stayed at the country after he was invited to play football, joining UE Sant Julià. After winning the 2008–09 Primera Divisió, he took part in the 2009–10 UEFA Champions League, becoming the first Chilean goalkeeper who has played at the tournament, before Claudio Bravo. In his second stint with Sant Julià, he coincided with his compatriot Juan José Bernales,

He also played for FC Andorra in the Primera Catalana, and for CE Principat and FC Santa Coloma in the Andorran Primera Divisió.

== Coaching career ==
In Chile, he graduated as a PE teacher at the University of La Frontera and in Europa he graduated as a football manager.

At the same time he was a player of UE Sant Julià, he worked as fitness and goalkeeping coach of the first team as well as coach of the youth ranks and the women's team. Then he worked as goalkeeping coach of the Andorra national teams at all levels, even performing as assistant coach of the senior team in the match versus England where Fabio Capello made his debut in 2007.

After a stint as goalkeeping coach of Chilean side Deportes Temuco, he returned to Andorra to go on working in the technical staff of clubs such as UE Sant Julià, Atlètic d'Escaldes and UE Santa Coloma.

== Personal life ==
He is nicknamed Mito Burgos, a short form of Guillermito (Little Guillermo).

During his first year in Andorra, where he came to take care of his niece, he worked in a shopping center based in Andorra la Vella.

== Honours ==
UE Sant Julià

- Primera Divisió: 2004–05, 2008–09
- Copa Constitució: 2008, 2010
- Andorran Supercup: 2004, 2009, 2010

FC Santa Coloma

- Primera Divisió: 2010–11
- Copa Constitució: 2012
