= 2025–26 Primera Divisió =

2025-26 Andorran Primera Divisió season

Primera Divisió
- Season: 2025–26
- Dates: 11 October 2025 – 17 May 2026
- Champions: Inter Club d'Escaldes (5th title)
- Relegated: Pas de la Casa
- Champions League: Inter Club d'Escaldes
- Conference League: Atlètic Club d'Escaldes; FC Santa Coloma
- Matches: 96
- Goals: 256 (2.67 per match)
- Top goalscorer: Borja Arellano (17 goals)
- All statistics correct as of 19 April 2026.

The 2025–26 Primera Divisió is the 31st season of top-tier football in Andorra. The season was planned to begin on 14 September 2025 and will end on 17 May 2026. The start of the season was however delayed due to issues related to the registration of foreign players, leaving nearly all clubs without the minimum amount of registered players to be able to enter a team. The competition was initially rescheduled to start during the last weekend of September, but was ultimately postponed further. To fit all matches into the remaining months, some matches were also scheduled during the international breaks of October and November, with the first match ultimately played on 11 October. Most affected was Pas de la Casa, which only played its first match on 26 October.

== Teams ==
The league consists of ten teams; the top eight teams from the previous season, and two teams promoted from the Segona Divisió. Atlètic Club d'Escaldes entered the season as defending champions.

The promoted teams were the 2024–25 Segona Divisió champions CE Carroi. They replaced the 2024–25 Primera Divisió bottom-placed team La Massana.

Locations of the 2025–26 Primera Divisió teams

Club	Location
Atlètic Club d'Escaldes	Escaldes-Engordany
Esperança	Andorra la Vella
Inter Club d'Escaldes	Escaldes-Engordany
CE Carroi	Andorra la Vella
Ordino	Ordino
Pas de la Casa	El Pas de la Casa
Penya Encarnada	Andorra la Vella
FC Rànger's	Andorra la Vella
FC Santa Coloma	Santa Coloma
UE Santa Coloma	Santa Coloma

== League table ==
Pos	Team	Pld	W	D	L	GF	GA	GD	Pts	Qualification or relegation
1	Inter Club d'Escaldes (C)	24	17	3	4	47	24	+23	54	Qualification for the Champions League first qualifying round
2	UE Santa Coloma (Note: UE Santa Coloma and Rànger's failed to obtain a UEFA license.) (R)	24	15	6	3	45	13	+32	51	Relegation to the 2026–27 Segona Divisió
3	Rànger's	24	15	3	6	46	22	+24	48	
4	FC Santa Coloma	24	13	5	6	45	20	+25	44	Qualification for the Conference League first qualifying round (Note: The 2026 Copa Constitució winners - Atlètic Club d'Escaldes - qualify for the Conference League first qualifying round.)
5	Atlètic Club d'Escaldes	24	10	4	10	31	26	+5	34	Qualification for the Conference League first qualifying round
6	Penya Encarnada	24	7	3	14	19	41	−22	24	
7	Ordino	24	6	4	14	27	42	−15	22	
8	Carroi	24	4	5	15	15	55	−40	17	
9	Esperança (O)	24	2	5	17	15	47	−32	11	Qualification for the Primera Divisió play-off
10	Pas de la Casa (Note: On 5 November 2025, the competition committee expelled Pas de la Casa from the league after they missed their first match and played the following two with only 13 players officially registered, due to issues with work permits and residences (while a minimum of 16 players are required). The club has the right to appeal but is for now considered as finishing last and will be relegated to the second level.) (D, R)	0	0	0	0	0	0	0	0	Expelled from the league

Source: Flashscore
Rules for classification: 1) Points; 2) Head-to-head points; 3) Head-to-head goal difference; 4) Head-to-head goals scored; 5) Goal difference; 6) Goals scored.
(C) Champions; (D) Disqualified; (O) Play-off winners; (R) Relegated

=== Results ===
The ten clubs play each other three times for a total of twenty-four matches.

Home \ Away	ACE	ESP	INT	CAR	ORD	PAS	PEN	RAN	SFC	SUE	ACE	ESP	INT	CAR	ORD	PAS	PEN	RAN	SFC	SUE
Atlètic Club d'Escaldes		3–0	0–1	3–0	1–0		2–0	0–2	2–2	1–2		2–1		3–0	0–0		2–0		2–3	
Esperança	0–1		1–2	0–0	1–2		0–1	0–2	0–2	0–4				4–1			0–1	1–1		0–3
Inter Club d'Escaldes	1–0	2–0		3–1	2–1		4–0	1–1	1–1	2–1	3–1	0–2		2–0	4–0		2–1			
Carroi	1–4	2–1	2–1		3–1		0–0	0–3	2–1	0–5								1–2	2–1	0–0
Ordino	0–0	1–1	0–2	3–1			2–4	0–2	2–1	0–2		2–2		5–0			0–1	1–2		
Pas de la Casa																				
Penya Encarnada	0–2	1–0	0–1	2–1	3–4			1–3	0–6	2–1		1–0		0–0				1–2	0–1	0–2
Rànger's	2–1	3–1	0–1	3–0	4–0		4–0		0–0	0–1	3–1		3–5						2–0	1–2
FC Santa Coloma	3–0	0–0	1–3	7–0	3–1		1–0	2–0		1–0		4–0	3–2		0–1					1–2
UE Santa Coloma	2–0	7–0	4–1	0–0	1–0		1–1	2–1	0–0		0–0		1–1		2–1			1–0		

Source: Flashscore
Legend: Blue = home team win; Yellow = draw; Red = away team win.

== Primera Divisió play-off ==
23 May 2026	Sporting Club d' Escaldes	1–3	Esperança	La Massana
20:30	Salguero 42'	Report	Ramírez 37', 87'; Nikiéma 63'	Stadium: CE Francesc Vila; Referee: David Vilanova Simarro

27 May 2026	Esperança	2–0 (5–1 agg.)	Sporting Club d' Escaldes	Andorra la Vella
20:30	Eric Balastegui 42'; Leandro Amaral 90'	Report		Stadium: Centre d'Entrenament de la FAF 1 Referee: Antoine Chiaramonti

== Season statistics ==
As of 19 April 2026

Rank	Player	Club	Goals
1	(Spain) Borja Arellano	Inter Club d'Escaldes	17
2	(Andorra) Guillaume López	FC Santa Coloma	16
3	(Portugal) Rodrigo Piloto	Atlètic Club d'Escaldes	10
4	(Spain) Yenerey Betancor	FC Santa Coloma	7
4	(Spain) Borja Morales	Rànger's	7
6	(Spain) Sascha Andreu	FC Santa Coloma	6
6	(Morocco) Domi Berlanga	Atlètic Club d'Escaldes	6
6	(Spain) Juan Cámara	Inter Club d'Escaldes	6
6	(Spain) Faysal Couhaib	Inter Club d'Escaldes	6
6	(Chile) Ignacio Pinilla	Penya Encarnada	6
