= FC Pas de la Casa =

Association football club in Andorra

Pas de la Casa
- Full name: Fútbol Club Pas de la Casa
- Founded: 2012; 14 years ago
- Ground: Centre d'Entrenament de la Massana
- Capacity: 300
- Chairman: María Antonia Serra
- Manager: Carles Andreu Rossell
- League: Segona Divisió
- 2025–26: Primera Divisió, 10th of 10 (expelled)
- Website: https://fcpasdelacasa.com/

Fútbol Club Pas de la Casa is an Andorran professional football club founded in 2012. The team currently plays in the Primera Divisió.

== Honours ==
- Segona Divisió:

Winners (1): 2022–23
