= Inter Club d'Escaldes =

Association football club in Andorra

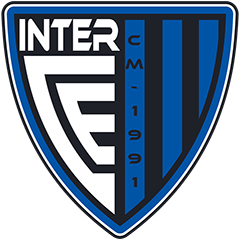
- Full name: Inter Club d'Escaldes
- Nickname: Inter
- Founded: 1991; 35 years ago
- Ground: Andorra Football Federation stadiums
- Chairman: Pablo Gómez
- Manager: Felip Ortiz
- League: Primera Divisió
- 2025–26: Primera Divisió, 1st of 10 (champions)
- Website: www.interescaldes.com
| Home colours | Away colours |

Inter Club d'Escaldes is an Andorran professional football club based in Escaldes-Engordany. It is a five-time champion of the Primera Divisió, the highest tier of Andorran football, in which the club competes.

== History ==
Inter Club d'Escaldes was founded in Escaldes-Engordany in 1991. The club was a founding member of Primera Divisió in 1995, the Premier League of Andorra. The club was playing since then in the top flight until April 2015 when the team was relegated after finishing 8th in the regular league. The club returned in Primera Divisió after two seasons, in May 2017.

El Inter finished the 1999–2000 and 2000–01 Primera Divisió seasons in third place, and became runners-up in Copa Constitució during the 2001–02 season, losing 2–0 against FC Lusitanos. But it was not until 2020 that the club won its first league title and its first domestic cup title.

After becoming champion in the 2019–20 Primera Divisió season, the club qualified for the 2020–21 UEFA Champions League, starting from a preliminary qualifying round. This was the first time in the club's history that El Inter participated in a UEFA European tournament. The club maintained a decent record of home European games, having beaten Hibernian 2–1 in 2023, FK Velež Mostar 5–1 in 2024 and FCSB 2–1 in 2025. The club won the league championship again in the 2020–21, 2021–22, 2024–25 and 2025–26 seasons.

After beating Kosovan side FC Drita 4–2 on penalties in the play-off round of the 2026–27 UEFA Conference League in August 2026, they became the first ever Andorran club to qualify for the main phase of a European competition.

== Colours and badge ==
In its beginnings the club had a strong support of Construccions Modernes, a company in the construction sector, to the point that its initials CM remained in its crest until 2019 . Due to team colours, blue and black, the team and fans are referenced as blau-i-negres.

Contruccions Modernes crest until 2015

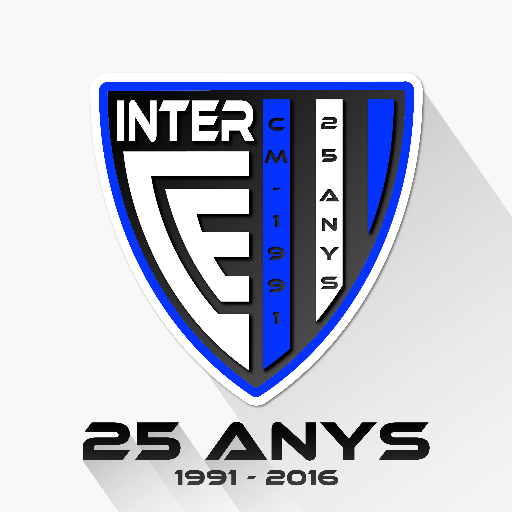
25th Anniversary crest (1991–2016)

== Honours ==
- Primera Divisió
  - Champions (5): 2019–20, 2020–21, 2021–22, 2024–25, 2025–26
- Copa Constitució
  - Winners (3): 2020, 2023, 2025
  - Runners-up (1): 2002
- Supercopa Andorrana:
  - Winners (5): 2020, 2021, 2022, 2023, 2026
- Segona Divisió
  - Winners (1): 2016–17

== European record ==
=== Matches ===
| Season | Competition | Round | Club | Home | Away | Aggregate |
|---|---|---|---|---|---|---|
| 2020–21 | UEFA Champions League | PR | (Kosovo) Drita | 1–2 | | |
| 2020–21 | UEFA Europa League | 2Q | (Republic of Ireland) Dundalk | 0–1 | | |
| 2021–22 | UEFA Champions League | PR | (Faroe Islands) HB Tórshavn | 1–0 | | |
| 2021–22 | UEFA Champions League | PR | (Kosovo) Prishtina | 0–2 | | |
| 2021–22 | UEFA Europa Conference League | 2Q | (Albania) Teuta | 0–3 (a.e.t.) | 2−0 | 2–3 |
| 2022–23 | UEFA Champions League | PR | (San Marino) La Fiorita | 2–1 | | |
| 2022–23 | UEFA Champions League | PR | (Iceland) Víkingur Reykjavík | 0–1 | | |
| 2022–23 | UEFA Europa Conference League | 2Q | (Romania) CFR Cluj | 1–1 | 0–3 | 1–4 |
| 2023–24 | UEFA Europa Conference League | 1Q | (Faroe Islands) Víkingur | 2−1 | 1–1 | 3–2 |
| 2023–24 | UEFA Europa Conference League | 2Q | (Scotland) Hibernian | 2−1 | 1–6 | 3–7 |
| 2024–25 | UEFA Conference League | 1Q | (Bosnia and Herzegovina) Velež Mostar | 5−1 | 1–1 | 6–2 |
| 2024–25 | UEFA Conference League | 2Q | (Greece) AEK Athens | 0–4 | 3–4 | 3–8 |
| 2025–26 | UEFA Champions League | 1Q | (Romania) FCSB | 2−1 | 1–3 | 3–4 |
| 2025–26 | UEFA Conference League | 2Q | (Slovenia) Olimpija Ljubljana | 1–1 | 2–4 | 3–5 |
| 2026–27 | UEFA Champions League | 1Q | (Gibraltar) Lincoln Red Imps | 1–1 | 1–3 | 2–4 |
| 2026–27 | UEFA Conference League | 3Q | (Estonia) Flora | 2−0 | 4−0 | 6−0 |
| 2026–27 | UEFA Conference League | PO | (Kosovo) Drita | 0–0 (a.e.t.) | 2–2 | 2–2 (4–2 p) |
| 2026–27 | UEFA Conference League | LP | (Sweden) Mjällby | —N/a | 0–2 | |
| 2026–27 | UEFA Conference League | LP | (Romania) Universitatea Craiova | 1–3 | —N/a | |
| 2026–27 | UEFA Conference League | LP | (Serbia) Crvena zvezda | —N/a | 1–2 | |
| 2026–27 | UEFA Conference League | LP | (Denmark) Copenhagen | | —N/a | |
| 2026–27 | UEFA Conference League | LP | (Spain) Getafe | —N/a | | |
| 2026–27 | UEFA Conference League | LP | (Denmark) Aarhus | | —N/a | |

Notes

- PR: Preliminary round
- 1Q: First qualifying round
- 2Q: Second qualifying round
- 3Q: Third qualifying round
- PO: Play-off round

== Current squad ==
=== First-team squad ===
As of 1 October, 2026

Note: Flags indicate national team as defined under FIFA eligibility rules; some limited exceptions apply. Players may hold more than one non-FIFA nationality.

| No. | Pos. | Nation | Player |
|---|---|---|---|
| 1 | GK | ESP | Pol Freixanet |
| 2 | DF | MEX | Anwar Hernández |
| 3 | DF | COL | Jilmar Torres |
| 4 | DF | ESP | Álex Sánchez |
| 5 | DF | MAR | Jaouad Erraji |
| 6 | MF | ESP | Víctor Alonso |
| 7 | MF | ESP | Juan Cámara |
| 8 | MF | ESP | David López |
| 9 | FW | ESP | Faysal Chouaib |
| 10 | FW | ESP | Ángel de la Torre |
| 11 | FW | MAR | Domi Berlanga |
| 13 | GK | ESP | Javi Díaz |
| 14 | MF | ESP | Antonio Otegui |
| 17 | DF | AND | Dacu |

| No. | Pos. | Nation | Player |
|---|---|---|---|
| 18 | DF | FRA | Robin Lafarge |
| 19 | MF | ESP | Pablo Molina |
| 20 | DF | ESP | Marc Jurado |
| 21 | DF | AND | Marc Rodríguez |
| 22 | DF | ESP | Marc Vargas |
| 23 | MF | ESP | Lamine Diaby |
| 24 | FW | ESP | Maurizio Pochettino |
| 28 | FW | ESP | Rafael Hermann |
| 31 | FW | MLI | Soule Sidibe |
| 70 | FW | ESP | Borja Arellano |
| 77 | MF | ESP | Yerai Dávila |
| - | GK | ESP | Juanda Terrádez |
| - | FW | ESP | Kaxe |

== Affiliated clubs ==
- (India) Inter Kashi
