= CF Esperança d'Andorra =

Andorran football club

Esperança d'Andorra
- Full name: Club de Futbol Esperança d'Andorra
- Short name: CFE
- Founded: 2020; 6 years ago
- Ground: Andorra Football Federation stadiums
- Chairman: Ricardo Manuel Batista Gonçalves
- Manager: Rui Beja
- League: Primera Divisió
- 2025-26: Primera Divisió, 9th of 10
| Home colours | Away colours | Third colours |

CF Esperança d'Andorra is a professional football club based in Andorra la Vella, Andorra.

== History ==
The club was founded in 2020.

In the 2022–23 season, it achieved promotion to the First Division of Andorra for the first time in its history and, in the following season, it achieved the goal of staying in the top division.

== Current squad ==
As of 6 April, 2026

Note: Flags indicate national team as defined under FIFA eligibility rules; some limited exceptions apply. Players may hold more than one non-FIFA nationality.

| No. | Pos. | Nation | Player |
|---|---|---|---|
| 1 | GK | AND | Anthony Moncada |
| 2 | DF | HON | Gerardo Pedroza |
| 3 | DF | ESP | Albert Montalbo |
| 5 | DF | AND | Miki del Castillo |
| 6 | DF | ESP | Miguel Ruiz |
| 7 | FW | ESP | Alberto Garrido |
| 8 | FW | COL | Juan Claros |
| 9 | FW | AND | Eric Balastegui |
| 10 | FW | ESP | Bryan Ramírez |
| 11 | FW | POR | Leandro Amaral |
| 12 | GK | AND | Ángel de la Fuente |

| No. | Pos. | Nation | Player |
|---|---|---|---|
| 17 | FW | MEX | Diego Nájera |
| 19 | FW | POR | Gonçalo Sousa |
| 20 | FW | ANG | Luwily Massomba |
| 24 | FW | CAN | Alex Massa |
| 25 | DF | POR | Guga |
| 29 | MF | POR | Tiago Sousa |
| 31 | GK | ESP | José Bejarano |
| 34 | MF | POR | Duarte Ramos |
| 44 | MF | FRA | Erwinn Nikiéma |
| 47 | DF | POR | Telmo Cardoso |
| 77 | FW | ESP | Rober |
| 80 | MF | POR | Telmo Neves |
| 91 | DF | MAC | Cláudio David |
