= CE Carroi =

Carroi
- Full name: Club Esportiu Carroi
- Nickname: L'Escola (The School or the Academy)
- Founded: 2014; 12 years ago
- Ground: Camp de Futbol d'Aixovall; Andorra la Vella
- Capacity: 2,000
- Chairman: Víctor Hugo Pérez Reyes
- Manager: Chauvard Julien
- League: Primera Divisió
- 2024–25: Segona Divisió, 1st of 5 (champions; promoted)
Home colours	Away colours

Club Esportiu Carroi is an Andorran professional football club based in the capital city of Andorra la Vella. The club currently plays in Primera Divisió.

== History ==
Founded in 2014 as a football academy CE Carroi has been a successful club at the national youth level also taking part in internationally renowned youth competitions in Europe, such as the Mediterranean International Cup or the Andorra International Cup.

Although, the club is known by his football academy and school, in July 2015 CE Carroi created a senior team to compete at the highest levels in the country thus being admitted in Segona Divisió.

CE Carroi finished 2nd at the end of the 2015–16 season in Segona Divisió, set to compete in a two-legged relegation play-off against the 7th placed club from Primera Divisió FC Encamp. It was announced that Encamp were awarded the tie against CE Carroi 3-0 due illegal lineup during the first leg of the relegation play-offs, therefore Encamp remained in the top flight and Carroi remained in the second tier one more season. The club reached the promotion at the end of the 2018–19 Segona Divisió after winning the Primera Divisió relegation play-offs against FC Lusitanos. In 2023, they were promoted back to the Multisegur League in the promotion playoff after winning 2-0 over UE Engordany. Although the game was away, Arnau Bravo managed to score 2 goals to secure promotion for their team.

== Colors and badge ==
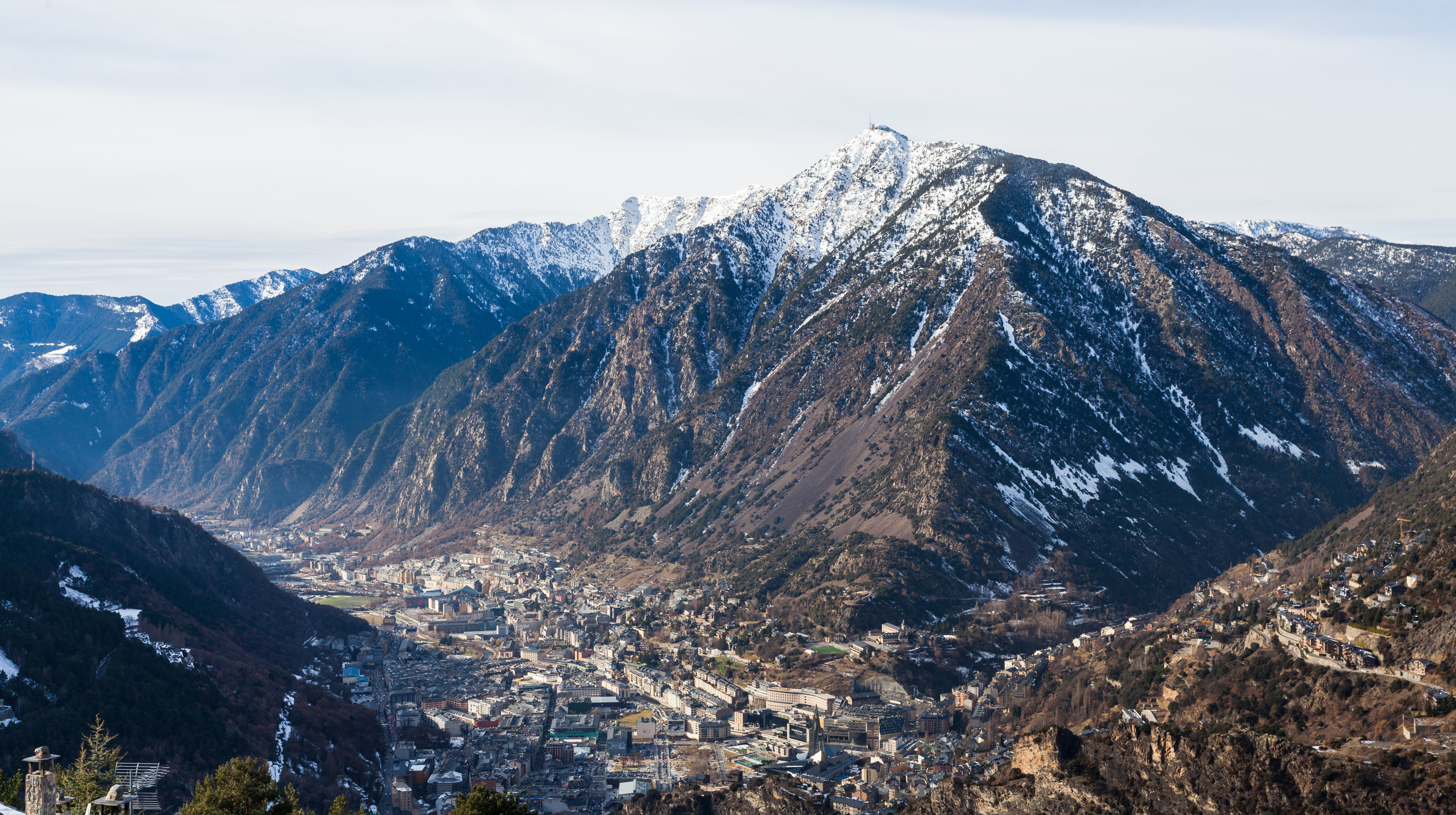
Pic de Carroi overlooks the valley of Andorra la Vella.

The club takes the name after one of the most emblematic mountains of the country, Pic de Carroi (elevation 2317m), located in the valley of the cities of Andorra la Vella and Escaldes-Engordany.

The mountain is represented in the club crest along with the Andorran flag colors and the colors of the team itself.

Purple and white are the colors of the club. These colors were also worn by other historical clubs of the capital city such as CE Principat or Constelació Esportiva d'Andorra la Vella.

== Women's Team ==
In a game in 2025, there was an altercation in a women's game.La Massana was playing CE Carroi, and a player from La Massana pushed and punched another player, while another player pulled the hair of another player. The player involved in the altercation was sent off. The police also ha to be called due to there being a brawl, the match was able to be resumed after the fight was over.

== Honours ==
- Segona Divisió
  - Winners (1): 2024–25
  - Runners-up (2): 2015–16, 2018–19

== Squad ==
As of 6 April, 2026

Note: Flags indicate national team as defined under FIFA eligibility rules; some limited exceptions apply. Players may hold more than one non-FIFA nationality.

No.	Pos.	Nation	Player
2	DF	HON	Andersson Cáceres
4	DF	ARG	Germán Mazzarino
5	DF	VEN	Andrés Rodríguez
6	DF	MEX	Edson Ramírez
7	DF	FRA	Ahmed Baaloul
8	MF	USA	Evan Waldrep
9	FW	USA	Fady Said Omar
10	MF	MEX	Víctor Gaba
11	MF	ESP	Nabil López
13	GK	MEX	Christopher Izaguirre
16	MF	AND	Nelson Meireles
17	FW	FRA	Bangaly Diarra

No.	Pos.	Nation	Player
19	MF	ARG	Omar Santillán
21	MF	USA	Michael Grimm
22	MF	FRA	Dylan Traore
23	DF	ESP	Javi López
25	DF	FRA	Quentin Laffont
27	MF	FRA	Jonathan Oulai
28	FW	FRA	Kevin Otto
30	GK	COL	Pacho
31	GK	ESP	Martín Scopazzo
34	DF	FRA	Leo Escade
46	FW	IND	Kabir Nath
87	DF	FRA	Kévin Dagnet
