= List of FC Santa Coloma seasons =

FC Santa Coloma, an association football club based in Santa Coloma, Andorra la Vella, Andorra, was founded in 1986. They, along with all other clubs in Andorra, participated in an amateur league without a structure or affiliation with any official institution until 1995, when they were founder members of the Primera Divisió (First Division) which became the top level of the Andorran football league system. The club is the most successful team in the division with 13 league titles, including the 1994–95 amateur league title which the Andorran Football Federation counts as an official league title. The 2009–10 Primera Divisió was won by the club without losing a game.

Along with league the club also competes in the Copa Constitució (Andorra Cup), the national football cup competition in Andorra. They are the most successful team in this competition too, winning it nine times. The 2003–04 season saw the introduction of the Andorran Supercup, a single match at the beginning of the season between the winners of the Primera Divisió and the Copa Constitució. Due to their regular domestic success FC Santa Coloma have qualified for the Supercup nearly every season with the exception of the 2013 edition. Their seven supercup wins is the most by a single club, meaning FC Santa Coloma are the most successful team in all three of Andorra's domestic football competitions. The club has never been relegated from the top division.

The Andorran Football Federation joined as a member of both the International Federation of Association Football (FIFA) and the Union of European Football Associations (UEFA) in 1996, allowing football clubs in Andorra to enter UEFA competitions. FC Santa Coloma first qualified for Europe with their league win in 2001, entering the qualifying round for the 2001–02 UEFA Cup, losing 8–1 on aggregate to Yugoslav team Partizan. Their first season in the UEFA Champions League was in the 2008–09 qualifying rounds, losing 7–2 on aggregate to Lithuanian team FBK Kaunas. Since 2007 the club has qualified for Europe each season entering either the Champions League or the Europa League (known as the UEFA Cup up to 2009). Their best run has been reaching the second qualifying round in both competitions.

== Key ==
- W = Winners
- RU = Runners-up
- SF = Semi-finals
- QF = Quarter-finals
- R3 = Third round
- QR2 = Second qualifying round
- QR1 = First qualifying round
- PR = Preliminary round
- DNQ = Did not qualify
- ? = Result not known

== Seasons ==
List of seasons, including league division and statistics, cup results and European competition results
Season	League record									Andorra Cup	Supercup	European competitions	
Season	Division	P	W	D	L	F	A	Pts	Pos	Andorra Cup	Supercup	UCL	UEL
1995–96	Primera Divisió	18	13	3	2	52	26	42	3rd	RU	— (Note: The Andorran Supercup was established in 2003, and first played at the start of the 2003–04 season.)	—	—
1996–97	Primera Divisió	22	10	3	9	57	31	33	4th	? (Note: The round of elimination is not known for this season, it is only confirmed that FC Santa Coloma did not reach the final.)	—	—	—
1997–98	Primera Divisió	20	18	1	1	99	11	55	2nd	RU	—	—	—
1998–99	Primera Divisió	22	17	3	2	64	19	54	2nd	RU	—	—	—
1999–2000	Primera Divisió	12	9	1	2	34	10	28	2nd	SF	—	—	—
2000–01	Primera Divisió	20	13	5	2	44	20	55	1st	W	—	—	—
2001–02	Primera Divisió	20	12	6	2	57	23	42	3rd	QF	—	—	QR
2002–03	Primera Divisió	22	14	7	1	58	14	49	1st	W	—	—	—
2003–04	Primera Divisió	20	14	3	3	44	21	45	1st	W	W	—	QR
2004–05	Primera Divisió	20	18	0	2	61	14	54	3rd	W	RU	—	QR1
2005–06	Primera Divisió	20	11	3	6	47	17	36	3rd	W	W	—	—
2006–07	Primera Divisió	20	14	2	4	41	17	44	2nd	W	RU	—	—
2007–08	Primera Divisió	20	14	5	1	69	10	47	1st	SF	W	—	QR1
2008–09	Primera Divisió	20	16	2	2	84	15	50	2nd	W	W	QR1	—
2009–10	Primera Divisió	20	13	7	0	46	14	46	1st	R3	RU	—	QR2
2010–11	Primera Divisió	20	14	5	1	71	11	47	1st	SF	RU	QR1	—
2011–12	Primera Divisió	20	11	5	4	56	17	38	2nd	W	RU	QR1	—
2012–13	Primera Divisió	20	10	9	1	31	16	39	2nd	SF	RU	—	QR1
2013–14	Primera Divisió	20	13	3	4	50	12	42	1st	SF	DNQ (Note: FC Santa Coloma did not qualify for the 2013 Andorran Supercup as they did not win the 2012–13 Primera Divisió nor the 2013 Copa Constitució.)	—	QR1
2014–15	Primera Divisió	20	13	3	4	64	14	42	1st	RU	RU	QR2	—
2015–16	Primera Divisió	20	14	5	1	44	8	47	1st	SF	W	QR1	—
2016–17	Primera Divisió	27	18	6	3	57	21	60	1st	RU	RU	QR1	—
2017–18	Primera Divisió	27	18	4	5	62	20	58	1st	W	W	QR1	—
2018–19	Primera Divisió	27	15	9	3	41	18	54	1st	RU	RU	QR2	—
2019–20	Primera Divisió	24	15	6	3	48	12	51	2nd	RU	W	PR	QR2
2020–21	Primera Divisió	20	8	8	4	28	19	32	3rd	SF	RU	—	PR
