= Francesc Ramirez =

Andorran footballer

Personal information
- Date of birth: 7 September 1976 (age 50)
- Place of birth: Andorra
- Position: Defender

Team information
- Current team: Santa Coloma
- Number: 12

Senior career*
Years	Team	Apps	(Gls)
1997–1998	CE Principat	?	(?)
1998–2000	FC Andorra	?	(?)
2000–2003	CE Principat	?	(?)
2003–2005	UE Sant Julià	?	(?)
2005–2010	FC Rànger's	?	(?)
2010–	FC Santa Coloma	?	(?)

International career
1997–2004	Andorra	32	(0)
- * Club domestic league appearances and goals

Francesc Ramirez (born 7 September 1976) is an Andorran footballer. He has played for the Andorra national team and Santa Coloma.

== Honours ==
CE Principat

- Primera Divisió: 1997–98
- Copa Constitució: 1998

UE Sant Julià

- Primera Divisió: 2004–05

FC Rànger's

- Primera Divisió: 2005–06, 2006–07

FC Santa Coloma

- Primera Divisió: 2010–11, 2013–14
- Copa Constitució: 2012

== International statistics ==
Updated 28 September 2014

Andorra national team
Year	Apps	Goals
1997	2	0
1998	4	0
1999	7	0
2000	7	0
2001	3	0
2002	4	0
2003	2	0
2004	3	0
Total	32	0
