= Ángel Martín (footballer, born 1978) =

Andorran footballer

Personal information
- Date of birth: 25 November 1978 (age 47)
- Position: Midfielder

Senior career*
Years	Team	Apps	(Gls)
1995–2017	FC Santa Coloma		

International career
1996–1999	Andorra	18	(0)
- * Club domestic league appearances and goals

Ángel Martín (born 25 November 1978) is a retired Andorran football midfielder.

== International career ==
At 17 years and 11 months, he played Andorra first game ever against Estonia on 13 November 1996. He remained his country youngest player until Andorra’s second ever game on 22 June 1997 also against Estonia, when Ildefons Lima played aged 17 years old and 6 months.

== Honours ==
- Primera Divisió:
  - Winners (10): 2000–01, 2002–03, 2003–04, 2007–08, 2009–10, 2010–11, 2013–14, 2014–15, 2015–16, 2016–17
- Copa Constitució:
  - Winners (8): 2001, 2003, 2004, 2005, 2006, 2007, 2009, 2012
- Supercopa Andorrana:
  - Winners (5): 2003, 2005, 2007, 2008, 2015
