= 2011–12 Primera Divisió =

Primera Divisió
- Season: 2011–12
- Champions: FC Lusitanos
- Relegated: FC Rànger's
- Champions League: FC Lusitanos
- Europa League: FC Santa Coloma; UE Santa Coloma
- Matches played: 80
- Goals scored: 336 (4.2 per match)
- Top goalscorer: Victor Cuadros (13 goals)
- Biggest home win: UE Santa Coloma 10-0 Rànger's; FC Santa Coloma 10-0 Rànger's
- Biggest away win: Rànger's 0-13 FC Santa Coloma
- Highest scoring: Rànger's 0-13 FC Santa Coloma

The 2011–12 Primera Divisió was the seventeenth season of top-tier football in Andorra. It began on 18 September 2011 and ended on 22 April 2012. The defending champions FC Santa Coloma placed second, while FC Lusitanos won their first championship.

== Stadia and locations ==
Location of teams in 2011-12 Primera Divisió

Team	Home town	Stadium	Capacity
UE Engordany	Escaldes-Engordany	DEVK-Arena	1,000
Inter Club d'Escaldes	Escaldes	DEVK-Arena	1,000
FC Lusitanos	Andorra la Vella	DEVK-Arena	1,000
CE Principat	Andorra la Vella	DEVK-Arena	1,000
FC Rànger's	Andorra la Vella	DEVK-Arena	1,000
UE Sant Julià	Aixovall	DEVK-Arena	1,000
FC Santa Coloma	Santa Coloma	DEVK-Arena	1,000
UE Santa Coloma	Santa Coloma	DEVK-Arena	1,000

== Competition format ==
The participating teams first played a conventional round-robin schedule with every team playing each opponent once "home" and once "away" (in actuality, the designation of home and away was purely arbitrary as the clubs did not have their own grounds) for a total of 14 games. The league was then split up in two groups of four teams with each of them playing teams within their group in a home-and-away cycle of games. The top four teams competed for the championship. The bottom four clubs played for one direct relegation spot and one relegation play-off spot. Records earned in the First Round were taken over to the respective Second Rounds.

== Promotion and relegation from 2010–11 ==
CE Benfica were relegated after last season due to finishing in 8th place. They were replaced by Segona Divisió runners-up FC Rànger's (the champions, Lusitanos B, were promotion ineligible).

Encamp, who finished last season in 7th place, and 3rd place Segona Divisió club Engordany played a two-legged relegation play-off. Engordany won the playoff, 5–1 on aggregate, and won promotion to this competition while Encamp were relegated.

== First round ==
Pos	Team	Pld	W	D	L	GF	GA	GD	Pts	Qualification
1	FC Santa Coloma	14	10	2	2	51	9	+42	32	Qualification to Championship round
2	Lusitanos	14	9	4	1	40	12	+28	31	Qualification to Championship round
3	UE Santa Coloma	14	9	3	2	54	12	+42	30	Qualification to Championship round
4	Sant Julià	14	8	4	2	47	14	+33	28	Qualification to Championship round
5	Principat	14	3	3	8	17	27	−10	12	Qualification to Relegation round
6	Engordany	14	3	3	8	17	45	−28	12	Qualification to Relegation round
7	Inter Club d'Escaldes	14	3	1	10	13	51	−38	10	Qualification to Relegation round
8	Rànger's	14	1	0	13	8	77	−69	3	Qualification to Relegation round

Source: 1a Divisió (in Catalan and English)
Rules for classification: 1) points; 2) goal difference; 3) number of goals scored.

Home \ Away	ENG	INT	LUS	PRI	RAN	SJU	SFC	SUE
Engordany		1–1	2–2	1–1	3–0	1–2	0–2	0–10
Inter Club d'Escaldes	3–2		0–5	1–0	0–3	0–3	0–7	0–5
Lusitanos	5–0	3–0		2–1	6–0	2–2	2–0	1–1
Principat	0–3	2–0	0–3		4–1	0–0	0–2	0–6
Rànger's	0–3	1–3	2–5	1–4		0–5	0–13	0–5
Sant Julià	9–0	12–3	1–2	3–2	6–0		1–1	0–1
FC Santa Coloma	5–0	2–1	1–1	3–2	10–0	0–1		2–0
UE Santa Coloma	5–1	5–1	2–1	1–1	10–0	2–2	1–3	

Source: fedandfut.com (in Catalan and English)
Legend: Blue = home team win; Yellow = draw; Red = away team win.

== Second round ==
=== Championship Round ===
Pos	Team	Pld	W	D	L	GF	GA	GD	Pts	Qualification
1	Lusitanos (C)	20	11	7	2	48	18	+30	40	Qualification to Champions League first qualifying round
2	FC Santa Coloma	20	11	5	4	56	17	+39	38	Qualification to Europa League first qualifying round (Note: The winners of the 2012 Copa Constitució, FC Santa Coloma, qualified for the first qualifying round of UEFA Europa League. Since they finished second, the third-placed team of the league also qualified for the Europa League.)
3	UE Santa Coloma	20	10	7	3	61	20	+41	37	Qualification to Europa League first qualifying round
4	Sant Julià	20	10	6	4	57	22	+35	36	

Source: fedandfut.com (in Catalan and English)
Rules for classification: 1) points; 2) goal difference; 3) number of goals scored.
(C) Champions
Notes:

Home \ Away	LUS	SJU	SFC	SUE
Lusitanos		2–1	2–0	0–0
Sant Julià	2–1		3–0	1–2
FC Santa Coloma	1–1	1–1		3–1
UE Santa Coloma	2–2	2–2	0–0	

Source: fedandfut.com (in Catalan and English)
Legend: Blue = home team win; Yellow = draw; Red = away team win.

=== Relegation Round ===
Pos	Team	Pld	W	D	L	GF	GA	GD	Pts	Qualification or relegation
5	Principat	20	8	3	9	32	32	0	27	
6	Engordany	20	6	4	10	32	51	−19	22	
7	Inter Club d'Escaldes (O)	20	5	3	12	34	65	−31	18	Qualification to relegation play-offs
8	Rànger's (R)	20	1	1	18	16	111	−95	4	Relegation to Segona Divisió

Source: fedandfut.com (in Catalan and English)
Rules for classification: 1) points; 2) goal difference; 3) number of goals scored.
(O) Play-off winners; (R) Relegated

Home \ Away	ENG	INT	PRI	RAN
Engordany		2–1	0–2	3–0
Inter Club d'Escaldes	2–2		1–3	5–5
Principat	1–0	1–2		5–2
Rànger's	0–8	1–10	0–3	

Source: fedandfut.com (in Catalan and English)
Legend: Blue = home team win; Yellow = draw; Red = away team win.

== Relegation playoffs ==
The seventh-placed club in the league will compete in a two-legged relegation playoff against the runners-up of the Segona Divisió, for one spot in 2012–13 Primera Divisió.

13 May 2012
18:00 CEST

Inter Club d'Escaldes	2–0	UE Extremenya

20 May 2012
20:00 CEST

UE Extremenya	0–1	Inter Club d'Escaldes
