= Óscar Sonejee =

Andorran footballer

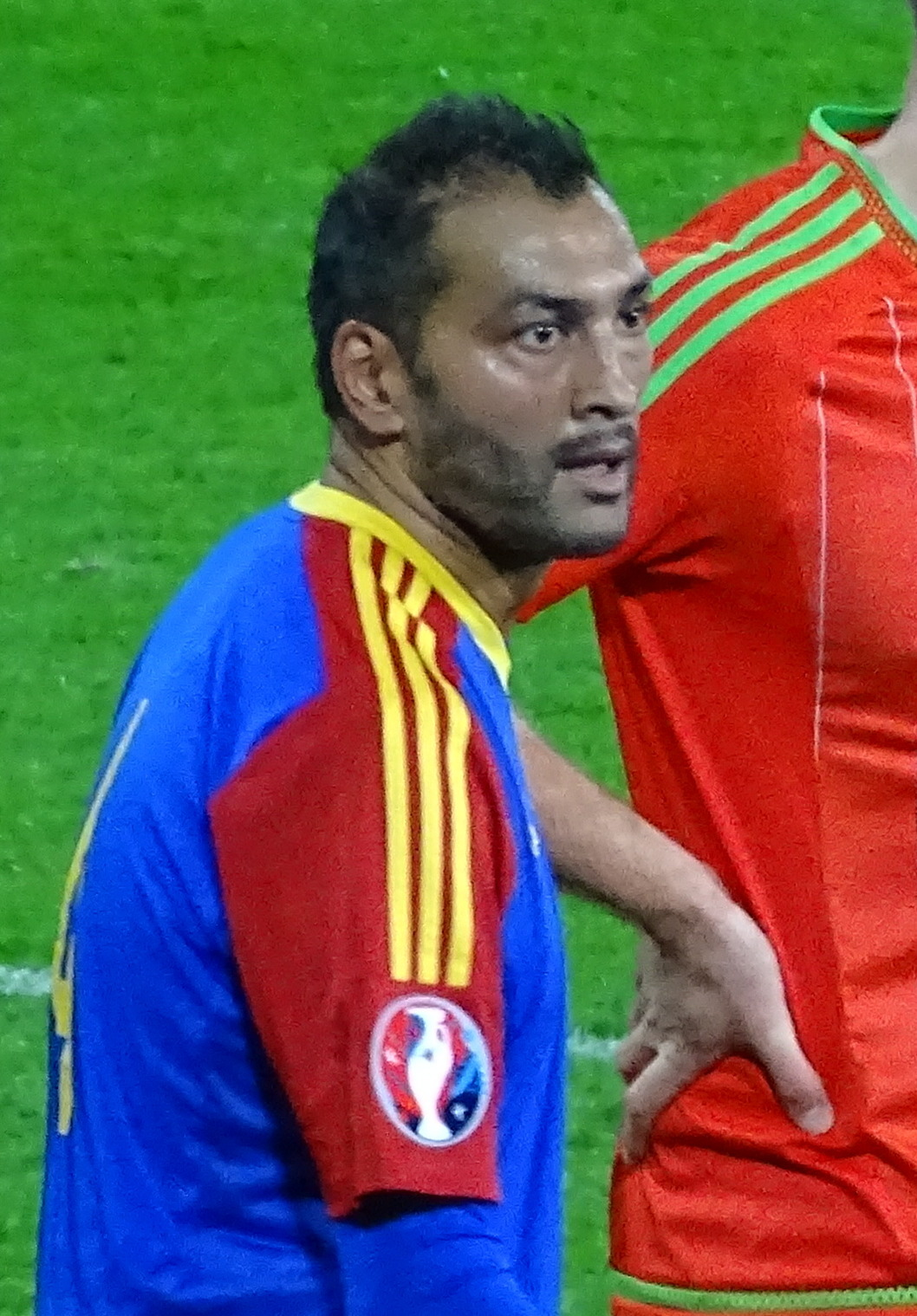
- Sonejee playing for Andorra in 2015

Personal information
- Full name: Óscar Sonejee Masand
- Date of birth: 26 March 1976 (age 50)
- Place of birth: Santa Coloma, Andorra
- Height: 1.84 m (6 ft 0 in)
- Position: Midfielder

Senior career*
Years	Team	Apps	(Gls)
1997–2001	FC Andorra		
2001–2002	Sant Julià		
2002	FC Andorra		
2002–2003	La Seu		
2003–2008	FC Andorra		
2008–2012	FC Santa Coloma		
2012–2013	Lusitanos	13	(0)
2013–2014	FC Andorra	26	(3)
2014–2015	Lusitanos	17	(3)
2015–2016	Sant Julià	14	(3)
2016–2017	Lusitanos	4	(0)

International career
1997–2015	Andorra	106	(4)

Managerial career
- 2014–2015: Andorra U16
- 2016–2017: Andorra U17
- * Club domestic league appearances and goals

Óscar Sonejee Masand (born 26 March 1976) is an Andorran former professional footballer who played as a midfielder.

He began his club career as a youth player with Sant Julià before playing for several teams based in Andorra, including three spells with FC Andorra and three with Lusitanos. He also spent four years with FC Santa Coloma, helping the side win two Primera Divisió titles. He retired from playing at the age of 40 in January 2017 during his third spell with Lusitanos.

He made his international debut for Andorra in 1997 during a defeat to Estonia. He scored the goal in 2000 that secured the nation's first ever point in a competitive international fixture when they drew 1–1 with Malta. He went on to become his country's most capped international player until 2015 when his record was surpassed by Ildefons Lima and he was the first Andorran player to reach 100 international caps. He finished his career with 106 caps and four goals for the Andorra national team, placing him second to Ildefons Lima in both categories. Between 2016 and 2017, he managed the Andorra under-17 side.

== Early life ==
Sonejee was born on 26 March 1976 in Santa Coloma, Andorra. His parents were both Indian but had decided to emigrate from their home in Delhi in the 1970s with their first two sons before Sonejee was born. After living in Paris, his father moved to Barcelona where he spent a year. However, he quickly looked to move on after believing the city was too suited to tourists and instead moved to Andorra, a small principality in the Pyrenees mountains, on the recommendation of other local Hindu merchants. After settling in the country, his wife and two sons moved to live with him and the family remained there once it gained independence in March 1993. Sonejee was born soon after, being the only member of the family born outside India.

Sonejee's first sporting participation was in winter sports, traditionally more popular in the mountainous region. However, in sixth grade, he played football for the first time and quickly took up the game. He speaks fluent Catalan and Hindi and can speak some English.

== Club career ==
Sonejee began his career as a youth player with his local side Sant Julià. His early performances for Andorra at youth level led to him being offered a trial with La Liga side Valencia after being spotted by one of the club's scouts. However, the trial was ultimately unsuccessful. He instead joined FC Andorra, an Andorran team that competes in the Spanish football league system. He featured eleven times for the club in the Segunda División B during the 1997–98 season as they suffered relegation.

In 2008, Sonejee was approached over a potential move to his parents' homeland India, receiving offers from East Bengal and Churchill Brothers. He originally signed a deal with East Bengal but later decided to accept the offer from Goa-based Churchill Brothers as he believed the culture in the city was more European based and would be easier to acclimatise to and the club was closer to the home of his wife's parents. However, he later discovered that his original contract with East Bengal was still valid and both clubs claimed ownership. When Churchill attempted to register Sonejee, the All India Football Federation (AIFF) blocked the move as they had already received a registration request by East Bengal. The situation eventually led to Sonejee backing out of a move to India, having spent a month training with Churchill, and instead signing for Santa Coloma in his home nation.

The most successful period of his career came during a four-year spell with Santa Coloma between 2008 and 2012 where he helped the side to win back-to-back Primera Divisió titles during the 2009–10 and 2010–11 seasons. He also won two Copa Constitució titles in 2009 and 2012.

After returning to his first team Sant Julià in 2015, Sonejee undertook his coaching badges alongside his playing career, obtaining a UEFA A and B Licence. He returned to Lusitanos the following year after being convinced by coach Raul Canete to postpone his retirement for another season. However, in January 2017, he officially announced his retirement from playing at the age of 40.

== International career ==
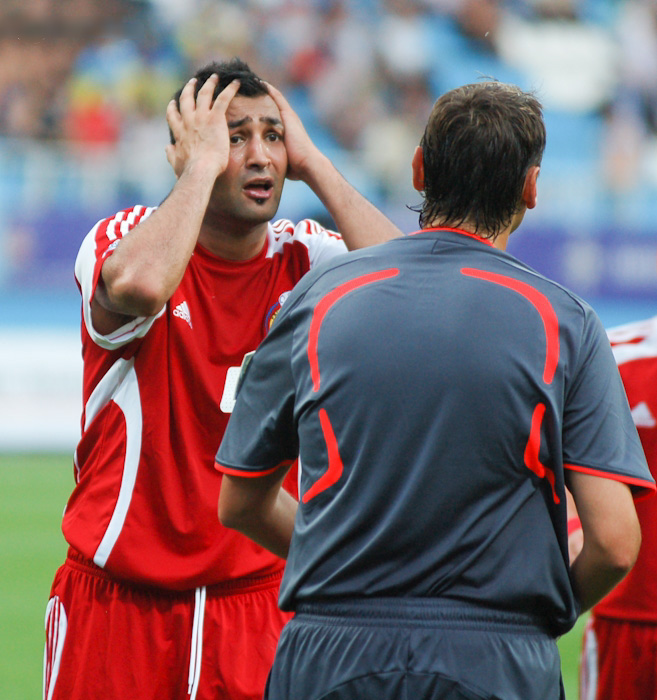
Sonejee playing for Andorra in 2009

Sonejee began his career at the same time as Andorra declared independence and formed its own footballing governing body, the Andorran Football Federation (AFF) in 1994. As such, he was present in his nation's youth sides as they began competing in international matches. He made his international debut in 1997 in a 4–1 friendly loss to Estonia at the Kuressaare linnastaadion in Andorra's second international fixture following their independence. In his second game three days later, he scored his first goal, in a defeat by the same margin to Latvia at the Daugava Stadium in Riga. He captained the team for the first time on 12 October 2005 against Armenia, scoring an own goal in a 0–3 home defeat in 2006 FIFA World Cup qualification.

Despite making his debut, Sonejee was still eligible to represent his parents' country India as he did not possess an Andorran passport at the time. He later admitted that, had he received a call up, he would have switched allegiance to India but stated "since I saw nobody was interested, I decided to continue playing for Andorra, and obtained that passport." In February 2000, he scored for Andorra, helping the side gain their first ever point in an international fixture by drawing 1–1 with Malta in the 2000 Rothmans International Tournament.

On 28 March 2007, during a UEFA Euro 2008 qualifier, he was involved in a spat with England striker Wayne Rooney, resulting with both players being booked and Rooney was substituted soon after by England manager Fabio Capello for fear of being sent off. Sonejee later accused Rooney of being arrogant and insulting him during the match.

On 6 June 2015, Sonejee became the first Andorran to earn 100 caps, when he captained the side to a 1–0 friendly home defeat to Equatorial Guinea. Prior to kick-off, he was presented with an honorary cap and medal by Victor Santos, the president of the AFF.

Sonejee retired from international football on 12 November 2015, with his final game for Andorra coming in a 1–0 friendly home defeat to Saint Kitts and Nevis; his national record of 106 caps was surpassed by Ildefons Lima in August 2017. At the time of his last cap, he was also Andorra's oldest ever international player at 39 years and 230 days. However, his record was surpassed in 2018 by Juli Sánchez.

== Managerial career ==
Sonejee managed the Andorra under-16 team at two UEFA youth tournaments, in Luxembourg in 2014 and Montenegro in 2015. He was appointed as manager of the Andorra under-17 side in January 2016, remaining in charge until October 2017.

== Personal life ==
Sonejee is of Indian heritage and works as an insurance salesman. His wife is also from India, hailing from Bandra, and the pair married in Jaipur. They have two children together. He is a fan of Bollywood cinema.

== Career statistics ==
Andorra national team
Year	Apps	Goals
1997	2	1
1998	7	0
1999	9	0
2000	8	1
2001	6	0
2002	5	0
2003	7	0
2004	7	0
2005	8	0
2006	5	0
2007	9	0
2008	4	0
2009	6	1
2010	2	0
2011	4	0
2012	3	0
2013	3	1
2014	3	0
2015	7	0
Total	106	4

Scores and results list Andorra's goal tally first

No.	Date	Venue	Opponent	Score	Result	Competition
1.	25 June 1997	Daugava Stadium, Riga, Latvia	Latvia	1–2	1–4	Friendly
2.	8 February 2000	Ta' Qali National Stadium, Attard, Malta	Malta	1–1	1–1	Friendly
3.	9 September 2009	Estadi Comunal d'Aixovall, Andorra la Vella, Andorra	Kazakhstan	1–3	1–3	2010 World Cup qualification
4.	14 August 2013	Zimbru Stadium, Chişinău, Moldova	Moldova	1–0	1–1	Friendly

== Honours ==
FC Santa Coloma

- Primera Divisió winner: 2009–10, 2010–11
- Copa Constitució winner: 2009, 2012

FC Lusitanos

- Andorran Supercup winner: 2013–14

== See also ==
- List of men's footballers with 100 or more international caps
