= 2012–13 Primera Divisió =

Primera Divisió
- Season: 2012–13
- Champions: FC Lusitanos
- Relegated: UE Engordany
- Champions League: FC Lusitanos
- Europa League: FC Santa Coloma

The 2012–13 Primera Divisió is the eighteenth season of top-tier football in Andorra. It began in September 2012 and ended in April 2013. The defending champions are FC Lusitanos, who won their first championship in the previous season. The title was retained by Lusitanos.

== Stadia and locations ==
Location of teams in 2012-13 Primera Divisió

Team	Home town	Stadium	Capacity
FC Encamp	Encamp	DEVK-Arena	1,000
UE Engordany	Escaldes-Engordany	DEVK-Arena	1,000
Inter Club d'Escaldes	Escaldes	DEVK-Arena	1,000
FC Lusitanos	Andorra la Vella	DEVK-Arena	1,000
CE Principat	Andorra la Vella	DEVK-Arena	1,000
UE Sant Julià	Aixovall	DEVK-Arena	1,000
FC Santa Coloma	Santa Coloma	DEVK-Arena	1,000
UE Santa Coloma	Santa Coloma	DEVK-Arena	1,000

== Competition format ==
The participating teams first played a conventional round-robin schedule with every team playing each opponent once "home" and once "away" (in actuality, the designation of home and away was purely arbitrary as the clubs did not have their own grounds) for a total of 14 games. The league was then split up in two groups of four teams with each of them playing teams within their group in a home-and-away cycle of games. The top four teams competed for the championship. The bottom four clubs played for one direct relegation spot and one relegation play-off spot. Records earned in the First Round were taken over to the respective Second Rounds.

== Promotion and relegation from 2011–12 ==
FC Rànger's were relegated after last season due to finishing in 8th place. They were replaced by Segona Divisió champions FC Encamp.

Inter Club d'Escaldes, who finished last season in 7th place, and 2nd place Segona Divisió club UE Extremenya played a two-legged relegation play-off. Inter Club d'Escaldes won the playoff, 3–0 on aggregate, and remained in the Primera Divisió while Extremenya remained in the Segona Divisió.

== First round ==
Pos	Team	Pld	W	D	L	GF	GA	GD	Pts	Qualification
1	Lusitanos	14	10	3	1	55	11	+44	33	Qualification to Championship round
2	UE Santa Coloma	14	9	3	2	39	14	+25	30	Qualification to Championship round
3	Sant Julià	14	9	3	2	32	9	+23	30	Qualification to Championship round
4	FC Santa Coloma	14	8	5	1	25	12	+13	29	Qualification to Championship round
5	Principat	14	3	3	8	17	30	−13	12	Qualification to Relegation round
6	Encamp	14	3	1	10	14	49	−35	10	Qualification to Relegation round
7	Engordany	14	2	2	10	14	47	−33	8	Qualification to Relegation round
8	Inter Club d'Escaldes	14	2	0	12	14	38	−24	6	Qualification to Relegation round

Source: 1a Divisió (in Catalan and English)
Rules for classification: 1) points; 2) goal difference; 3) number of goals scored.

Home \ Away	ENC	ENG	INT	LUS	PRI	SJU	SFC	SUE
Encamp		1–1	2–3	0–11	1–6	0–5	0–4	2–9
Engordany	1–4		3–2	1–4	1–1	0–4	1–3	1–5
Inter Club d'Escaldes	1–2	1–3		1–7	1–4	0–2	0–2	1–3
Lusitanos	3–0	6–1	5–1		5–0	1–1	3–0	2–2
Principat	2–0	2–0	0–2	1–3		1–4	1–3	1–1
Sant Julià	5–0	5–0	1–0	1–4	1–0		1–1	0–1
FC Santa Coloma	2–0	2–1	2–1	0–0	2–2	1–1		2–0
UE Santa Coloma	2–0	7–0	2–0	2–1	4–2	0–1	1–1	

Source: 1a Divisió (in Catalan and English)
Legend: Blue = home team win; Yellow = draw; Red = away team win.

== Second round ==
=== Championship Round ===
Pos	Team	Pld	W	D	L	GF	GA	GD	Pts	Qualification
1	Lusitanos (C)	20	13	5	2	65	17	+48	44	Qualification to Champions League first qualifying round
2	FC Santa Coloma	20	10	9	1	31	16	+15	39	Qualification to Europa League first qualifying round (Note: Winners of the 2013 Copa Constitució competition.)
3	UE Santa Coloma	20	11	4	5	47	25	+22	37	Qualification to Europa League first qualifying round
4	Sant Julià	20	10	4	6	38	18	+20	34	

Source: fedandfut.com (in Catalan and English)
Rules for classification: 1) points; 2) goal difference; 3) number of goals scored.
(C) Champions
Notes:

Home \ Away	LUS	SJU	SFC	SUE
Lusitanos		2–0	0–0	2–1
Sant Julià	2–4		0–0	0–1
FC Santa Coloma	0–0	1–0		2–2
UE Santa Coloma	2–1	1–4	1–2	

Source: fedandfut.com (in Catalan and English)
Legend: Blue = home team win; Yellow = draw; Red = away team win.

=== Relegation round ===
Pos	Team	Pld	W	D	L	GF	GA	GD	Pts	Qualification or relegation
5	Principat	20	6	3	11	23	35	−12	21	
6	Inter Club d'Escaldes	20	6	0	14	22	42	−20	18	
7	Encamp (O)	20	5	2	13	18	55	−37	17	Qualification to relegation play-offs
8	Engordany (R)	20	4	3	13	20	56	−36	15	Relegation to Segona Divisió

Source: fedandfut.com (in Catalan and English)
Rules for classification: 1) points; 2) goal difference; 3) number of goals scored.
(O) Play-off winners; (R) Relegated

Home \ Away	ENC	ENG	INT	PRI
Encamp		2–1	1–0	0–2
Engordany	1–1		2–1	1–0
Inter Club d'Escaldes	1–0	3–0		2–1
Principat	1–0	2–1	0–1	

Source: fedandfut.com (in Catalan and English)
Legend: Blue = home team win; Yellow = draw; Red = away team win.

== Relegation play-offs ==
The seventh-placed club in the league competed in a two-legged relegation play-off against the runners-up of the 2012–13 Segona Divisió, for one spot in 2013–14 Primera Divisió.

20 May 2013
20:00

FC Encamp	3 – 0	Atlètic Club d'Escaldes

DEVK-Arena, Sant Julià de Lòria

26 May 2013
18:00

Atlètic Club d'Escaldes	1 – 5	FC Encamp

DEVK-Arena, Sant Julià de Lòria
