= Gabi Riera =

Andorran footballer

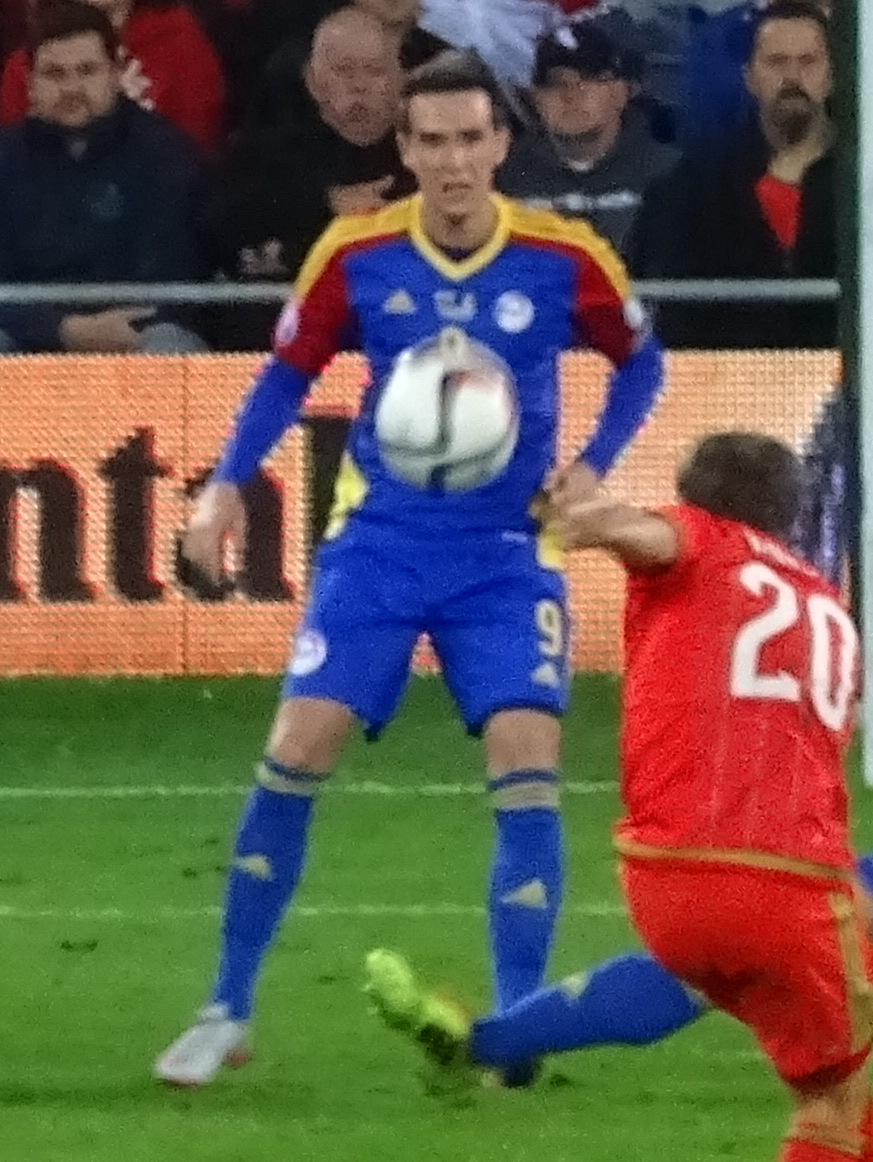

Personal information
- Full name: Gabriel Riera Lancha
- Date of birth: 5 June 1985 (age 41)
- Place of birth: Andorra
- Position: Forward

Team information
- Current team: UE Engordany
- Number: 7

Senior career*
Years	Team	Apps	(Gls)
2004–2005	FC Andorra		
2005–2006	Rànger's		
2006–2007	Cádiz B		
2007–2008	Gimnástico Alcázar	33	(8)
2008–2009	Principat	12	(1)
2009–2012	Sant Julià		
2012–2014	UE Santa Coloma	34	(13)
2014–2019	FC Santa Coloma	125	(51)
2019–	UE Engordany	11	(3)

International career^{‡}
2004–	Andorra	40	(1)
- * Club domestic league appearances and goals as of 21:54, 19 December 2019 (UTC) ‡ National team caps and goals as of 21 March 2018

Gabriel Riera Lancha (born 5 June 1985) is an Andorran footballer who plays for UE Engordany in the Andorran First Division and Andorra national football team.

== International goals ==
Updated 28 September 2014.

No.	Date	Venue	Opponent	Score	Result	Competition	Ref.
1.	4 June 2005	U Nisy Stadion, Liberec, Czech Republic	Czech Republic	3–1	8–1	2006 FIFA World Cup qualification	
