= 2012 Copa Constitució =

Tournament details
- Country: Andorra

Final positions
- Champions: FC Santa Coloma
- Runners-up: FC Lusitanos
- UEFA Europa League: FC Santa Coloma

The 2012 Copa Constitució was the twentieth season of Andorra's football knockout tournament. The competition began on 15 January 2012 with the matches of the first elimination round and ended in May 2012 with the Final. UE Sant Julià are the defending champions. The winners earned a place in the first qualifying round of the 2012–13 UEFA Europa League.

== Results ==
=== Preliminary round ===
This round will be entered by the bottom four from the ten 2011–12 Segona Divisió teams at the time of the mid-season break: Penya Encarnada d'Andorra, FS La Massana, Principat B and Atlètic Club d'Escaldes. The matches will be played on 15 January 2012.

Team 1	Score	Team 2
FS La Massana	3–1	Atlètic Club d'Escaldes
Principat B	4–2	Penya Encarnada d'Andorra

=== First elimination round ===
This round will be entered by the top six from the ten 2011–12 Segona Divisió teams at the time of the mid-season break: Lusitanos B, UE Extremenya, FC Encamp, UE Santa Coloma B, Casa Estrella del Benfica and FC Santa Coloma B and will join the winners of the preliminary elimination round. The matches will be played on 22 January 2012.

Team 1	Score	Team 2
FS La Massana	1–3	UE Santa Coloma B
Principat B	6–4	FC Encamp
FC Santa Coloma B	3–1	Casa Estrella del Benfica
UE Extremenya	2–0	FC Lusitanos B

=== Second elimination round ===
The teams from 2011–12 Primera Divisió placed fifth to eighth after 10 rounds played – Inter Club d'Escaldes, CE Principat, UE Engordany and FC Rànger's – enter in this round and will join the winners of the first elimination round. For each match, one Segona Divisió and one Primera Divisió team have been drawn together. The matches will be played on 29 January 2012.

Team 1	Score	Team 2
UE Santa Coloma B	2–1	UE Engordany
Principat B	0–3	Inter Club d'Escaldes
FC Santa Coloma B	0–7	CE Principat
UE Extremenya	1–4	FC Rànger's

=== Third elimination round ===
The winners from the previous round will compete in this round together with the teams from Primera Divisió placed first to fourth after 10 rounds played – FC Santa Coloma, FC Lusitanos, UE Sant Julià, and UE Santa Coloma. The first legs will be played on 5 and 12 February 2012, while the second legs took place on 19 February 2012.

Team 1	Agg.	Team 2	1st leg	2nd leg
UE Santa Coloma B	2–12	UE Santa Coloma	2–6	0–6
Inter Club d'Escaldes	0–7	FC Lusitanos	0–1	0–6
CE Principat	1–9	UE Sant Julià	0–3	1–6
FC Rànger's	0–17	FC Santa Coloma	0–7	0–10

=== Semifinals ===
The first legs were played on 6 May 2012 while the second legs were played on 13 May 2012.

Team 1	Agg.	Team 2	1st leg	2nd leg
UE Santa Coloma	2–3(aet)	FC Lusitanos	1–1	1–2
UE Sant Julià	0–5	FC Santa Coloma	0–3	0–2

=== Final ===
27 May 2012
17:00 CEST

FC Lusitanos	0 − 1	FC Santa Coloma
		Luis Filipe 42' (o.g.)

Estadi Comunal d'Aixovall, Aixovall
Referee: Ignasi Villamayor
