= 2010–11 Primera Divisió =

Primera Divisió
- Season: 2010–11
- Champions: FC Santa Coloma
- Relegated: FC Encamp; CE Benfica
- Champions League: FC Santa Coloma
- Europa League: UE Sant Julià; FC Lusitanos; UE Santa Coloma
- Matches: 80
- Goals: 331 (4.14 per match)
- Biggest home win: FC Santa Coloma 12-1 CE Benfica
- Biggest away win: CE Benfica 0-13 CE Principat
- Highest scoring: FC Santa Coloma 12-1 CE Benfica; CE Benfica 0-13 CE Principat

The 2010–11 Primera Divisió was the sixteenth season of top-tier football in Andorra. It began on 19 September 2010 and ended on 20 March 2011. FC Santa Coloma were the defending champions, having won their fifth Andorran championship last season.

== Stadia and locations ==
Location of teams in Primera Divisió 2010-11

Team	Home town	Stadium	Capacity
CE Benfica	Aixovall	Estadi Comunal d'Aixovall	1,800
CE Principat	Andorra la Vella	Estadi Comunal d'Andorra la Vella	850
FC Encamp	Encamp	Estadi Comunal d'Aixovall	1,800
FC Lusitanos	Andorra la Vella	Estadi Comunal d'Andorra la Vella	850
FC Santa Coloma	Santa Coloma	Estadi Comunal d'Aixovall	1,800
Inter Club d'Escaldes	Escaldes	Estadi Comunal d'Aixovall	1,800
UE Sant Julià	Aixovall	Estadi Comunal d'Aixovall	1,800
UE Santa Coloma	Santa Coloma	Estadi Comunal d'Aixovall	1,800

== Competition format ==
The participating teams first played a conventional round-robin schedule with every team playing each opponent once "home" and once "away" (in actuality, the designation of home and away was purely arbitrary as the clubs did not have their own grounds) for a total of 14 games. The league was then split up in two groups of four teams with each of them playing teams within their group in a home-and-away cycle of games. The top four teams competed for the championship. The bottom four clubs played for one direct relegation spot and one relegation play-off spot. Records earned in the First Round were taken over to the respective Second Rounds.

== Promotion and relegation from 2009–10 ==
Engordany were relegated after last season due to finishing in 8th place. They were replaced by Segona Divisió champions Casa Estrella del Benfica.

Encamp, who finished last season in 7th place, and 3rd place Segona Divisió club Extremenya played a two-legged relegation play-off (normally, the runners-up of the Segona Divisió would participate, but as promotion-ineligible Lusitanos B finished in that spot, the playoff spot was given to the 3rd place club). Encamp kept their spot in Primera Divisió by winning on aggregate 5–2 against Extremenya.

== First round ==
=== League table ===
Pos	Team	Pld	W	D	L	GF	GA	GD	Pts	Qualification
1	Sant Julià	14	10	4	0	39	4	+35	34	Qualification to Championship round
2	FC Santa Coloma	14	10	3	1	63	7	+56	33	Qualification to Championship round
3	Lusitanos	14	10	2	2	34	12	+22	32	Qualification to Championship round
4	UE Santa Coloma	14	9	0	5	51	16	+35	27	Qualification to Championship round
5	Inter Club d'Escaldes	14	4	1	9	17	46	−29	13	Qualification to Relegation round
6	Principat	14	3	3	8	19	32	−13	12	Qualification to Relegation round
7	CE Benfica	14	1	2	11	10	67	−57	5	Qualification to Relegation round
8	Encamp	14	1	1	12	14	63	−49	4	Qualification to Relegation round

Source: RSSSF
Rules for classification: 1) points; 2) goal difference; 3) number of goals scored.

=== Results ===
Home \ Away	CEB	ENC	INT	LUS	PRI	SFC	SUE	SJU
CE Benfica		4–1	1–7	1–3	0–0	0–10	0–10	1–3
Encamp	1–1		1–2	2–7	4–1	0–9	1–6	0–8
Inter Club d'Escaldes	2–1	2–1		1–5	1–2	0–10	0–5	0–2
Lusitanos	3–0	5–0	1–0		2–0	2–1	3–2	1–1
Principat	5–0	5–1	2–2	0–2		2–2	0–4	0–3
FC Santa Coloma	12–1	6–0	3–0	3–0	3–0		2–1	0–0
UE Santa Coloma	4–0	4–2	8–0	1–0	4–1	1–2		1–3
Sant Julià	6–0	3–0	4–0	0–0	4–1	0–0	2–0	

Source: RSSSF
Legend: Blue = home team win; Yellow = draw; Red = away team win.

== Second round ==
=== Championship Round ===
Pos	Team	Pld	W	D	L	GF	GA	GD	Pts	Qualification
1	FC Santa Coloma (C)	20	15	4	1	71	10	+61	49	Qualification to Champions League first qualifying round
2	Sant Julià	20	12	6	2	46	9	+37	42	Qualification to Europa League second qualifying round (Note: Sant Julià have qualified for the 2011–12 UEFA Europa League second qualifying round by winning the 2011 Copa Constitució.)
3	Lusitanos	20	11	5	4	43	20	+23	38	Qualification to Europa League first qualifying round
4	UE Santa Coloma	20	10	0	10	54	27	+27	30	Qualification to Europa League first qualifying round

Source: RSSSF
Rules for classification: 1) points; 2) goal difference; 3) number of goals scored.
(C) Champions
Notes:

Home \ Away	LUS	SFC	SUE	SJU
Lusitanos		1–1	3–0	1–1
FC Santa Coloma	3–2		1–0	1–0
UE Santa Coloma	2–1	0–1		0–2
Sant Julià	1–1	1–1	3–1	

Source: RSSSF
Legend: Blue = home team win; Yellow = draw; Red = away team win.

=== Relegation Round ===
Pos	Team	Pld	W	D	L	GF	GA	GD	Pts	Qualification or relegation
5	Principat	20	8	4	8	49	34	+15	28	
6	Inter Club d'Escaldes	20	6	3	11	28	54	−26	21	
7	Encamp (R)	20	4	1	15	24	79	−55	13	Qualification to relegation play-offs
8	CE Benfica (R)	20	1	3	16	15	97	−82	6	Relegation to Segona Divisió

Source: RSSSF
Rules for classification: 1) points; 2) goal difference; 3) number of goals scored.
(R) Relegated

Home \ Away	CEB	ENC	INT	PRI
CE Benfica		2–3	0–5	0–13
Encamp	4–1		1–3	0–1
Inter Club d'Escaldes	1–1	1–2		0–0
Principat	4–1	8–0	4–1	

Source: RSSSF
Legend: Blue = home team win; Yellow = draw; Red = away team win.

== Relegation playoffs ==
FC Encamp finished seventh in the league and will compete in a two-legged relegation playoff against UE Engordany, the third place team of the Segona Divisió, for one spot in 2011–12 Primera Divisió. Engordany won the playoff, 5–1 on aggregate, and were promoted to the Primera Divisió while Encamp were relegated.

17 April 2011
18:00 CEST

FC Encamp	1 – 3	UE Engordany
Raventós 7' Flores (red card) 63'	Report	14' (pen.) Rodríguez; 36' Mengual; 46' De Costa

Estadi Comunal d'Aixovall, Aixovall

1 May 2011
18:00 CEST

UE Engordany	2 – 0	FC Encamp
Rodríguez 43'; Agharbi 90+1' Ferré (red card) 90+2'	Report	(yellow card) 38' (yellow-red card) 90+2' Medeiros

Centre Esportiu d'Alàs, Alàs

Source: RSSSF
