= 2002–03 Primera Divisió =

Primera Divisió
- Season: 2002–03
- Dates: 15 September 2002 – 4 May 2003
- Champions: FC Santa Coloma
- Relegated: Sporting d'Escaldes; Extremenya
- UEFA Cup: FC Santa Coloma
- UEFA Intertoto Cup: Encamp
- Matches played: 96
- Goals scored: 421 (4.39 per match)
- Longest unbeaten run: FC Santa Coloma (21 matches)
- Longest winless run: Sporting d'Escaldes (16 matches)
- Longest losing run: Sporting d'Escaldes (16 matches)

Statistics of Primera Divisió in the 2002/2003 season.

== Overview ==
It was contested by 9 teams, and FC Santa Coloma won the championship.

== First round ==
Pos	Team	Pld	W	D	L	GF	GA	GD	Pts	Qualification or relegation
1	FC Santa Coloma	16	13	3	0	51	8	+43	42	Qualification to Championship round
2	Encamp	16	10	4	2	49	10	+39	34	Qualification to Championship round
3	Sant Julià	16	9	3	4	57	17	+40	30	Qualification to Championship round
4	Inter d'Escaldes	16	8	2	6	30	33	−3	26	Qualification to Championship round
5	Principat	16	6	5	5	32	25	+7	23	Qualification to Relegation round
6	Lusitans	16	7	1	8	44	33	+11	22	Qualification to Relegation round
7	Rànger's	16	6	3	7	39	39	0	21	Qualification to Relegation round
8	Extremenya	16	2	1	13	17	63	−46	7	Qualification to Relegation round
9	Sporting d'Escaldes (R)	16	0	0	16	10	101	−91	0	Relegation to Segona Divisió

Rules for classification: 1) points; 2) head-to-head points; 3) head-to-head goal difference; 4) goal difference; 5) number of goals scored; 6) fair-play points; 7) playoff match
(R) Relegated

Home \ Away	ENC	EXT	INT	LUS	PRI	RAN	SFC	SJU	SPO
Encamp		8–0	2–0	0–0	2–1	7–0	1–2	2–0	7–0
Extremenya	1–4		0–1	3–6	2–2	0–1	0–7	0–5	3–1
Inter d'Escaldes	3–2	3–1		3–0	3–2	4–1	0–1	1–5	4–1
Lusitans	1–2	5–2	4–1		1–2	0–1	1–2	0–9	5–1
Principat	0–0	2–1	1–1	1–0		2–2	0–5	1–2	2–0
Rànger's	0–2	9–1	1–1	2–5	4–3		1–3	2–2	7–2
FC Santa Coloma	1–1	3–0	5–1	4–0	0–0	4–1		1–1	8–0
Sant Julià	0–0	5–1	5–1	0–1	2–3	3–1	1–2		13–0
Sporting d'Escaldes	1–9	1–2	2–3	0–15	0–10	0–6	0–3	1–4	

Legend: Blue = home team win; Yellow = draw; Red = away team win.

== Second round ==
=== Championship Round ===
Pos	Team	Pld	W	D	L	GF	GA	GD	Pts	Qualification
1	FC Santa Coloma (C)	22	14	7	1	58	14	+44	49	Qualification to UEFA Cup qualifying round
2	Encamp	22	14	6	2	63	16	+47	48	Qualification to Intertoto Cup first round
3	Sant Julià	22	11	5	6	73	28	+45	38	
4	Inter d'Escaldes	22	9	2	11	37	54	−17	29	

Rules for classification: 1) points; 2) head-to-head points; 3) head-to-head goal difference; 4) goal difference; 5) number of goals scored; 6) fair-play points; 7) playoff match
(C) Champions

Home \ Away	ENC	INT	SFC	SJU
Encamp		5–1	0–0	2–1
Inter d'Escaldes	1–3		2–1	3–5
FC Santa Coloma	1–1	2–0		2–2
Sant Julià	2–3	5–0	1–1	

Legend: Blue = home team win; Yellow = draw; Red = away team win.

=== Relegation Round ===
Pos	Team	Pld	W	D	L	GF	GA	GD	Pts	Relegation
1	Lusitans	22	12	1	9	63	40	+23	37	
2	Principat	22	10	5	7	42	32	+10	35	
3	Rànger's	22	9	3	10	54	51	+3	30	
4	Extremenya (R)	22	2	1	19	21	85	−64	7	Relegation to Segona Divisió

Rules for classification: 1) points; 2) head-to-head points; 3) head-to-head goal difference; 4) goal difference; 5) number of goals scored; 6) fair-play points; 7) playoff match
(R) Relegated

Home \ Away	EXT	LUS	PRI	RAN
Extremenya		0–4	1–2	0–5
Lusitans	3–2		4–1	3–0
Principat	2–0	0–2		3–0
Rànger's	6–1	4–3	0–2	

Legend: Blue = home team win; Yellow = draw; Red = away team win.
