= Álex Somoza =

Andorran footballer

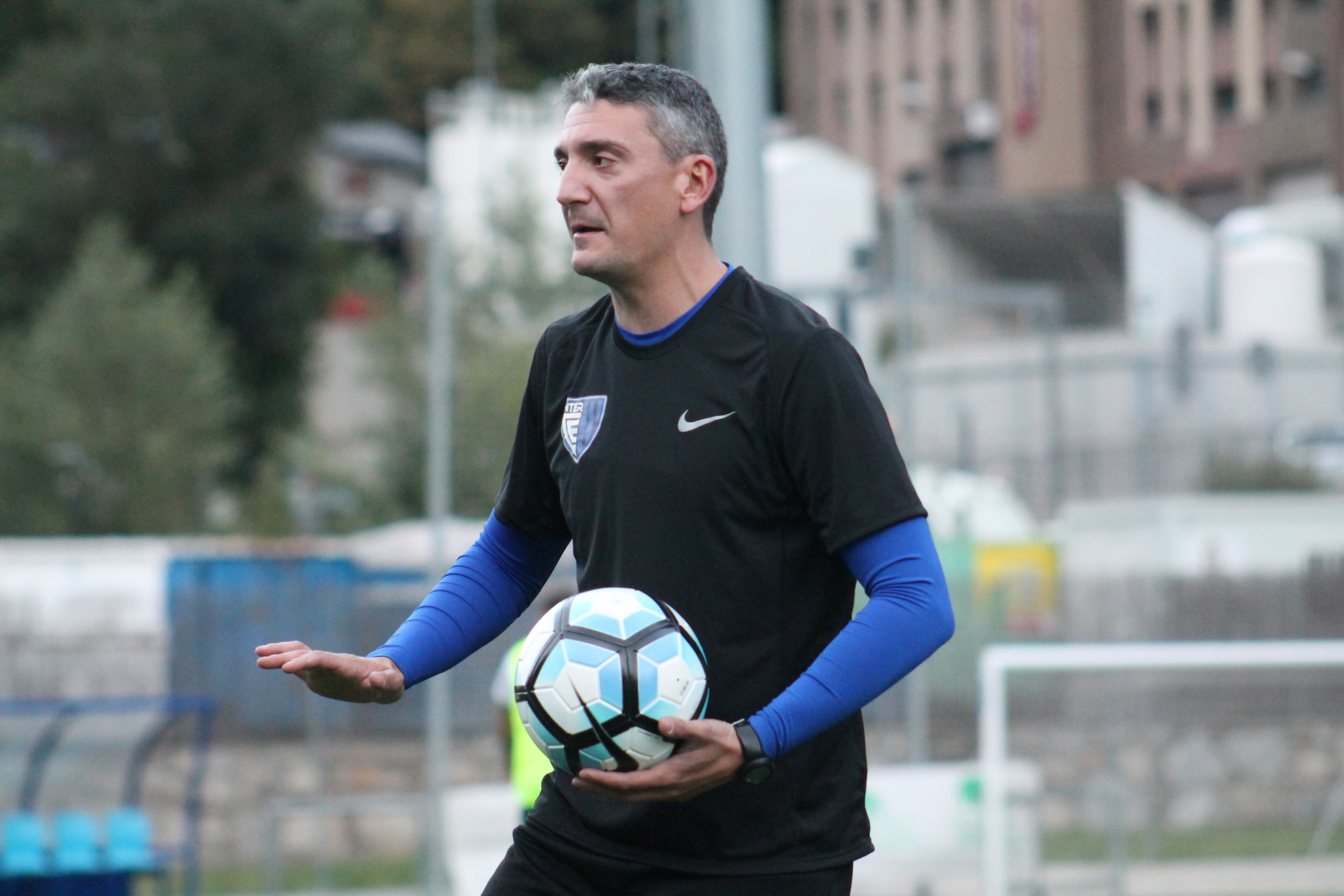
- Somoza in 2017.

Personal information
- Full name: Alexandre Somoza Losada
- Date of birth: 7 July 1986 (age 40)
- Position: Midfielder

Team information
- Current team: Inter Club d'Escaldes

Senior career*
Years	Team	Apps	(Gls)
2005–2006	FC Santa Coloma		
2006–2007	CE Principat		
2007–2008	FC Rànger's		
2008–2009	CD Binéfar		
2009–2014	FC Andorra		

International career^{‡}
2006–2014	Andorra	9	(0)
- * Club domestic league appearances and goals as of 16:09, 21 August 2017 (UTC) ‡ National team caps and goals as of 16:09, 6 September 2011 (UTC)

Álex Somoza (born 7 July 1986) is an Andorran international footballer who plays club football for FC Andorra, as a midfielder. Today is coach of Inter Club d'Escaldes.

== Career ==
Somoza has played club football for FC Santa Coloma, CE Principat, FC Rànger's, CD Binéfar and FC Andorra.

He made his international debut for Andorra in 2006, and has appeared in FIFA World Cup qualifying matches for them.
