= Matías Rudler =

Argentine footballer (born 1988)

Personal information
- Full name: Matías Ezequiel Rudler
- Date of birth: 25 April 1988 (age 38)
- Place of birth: Buenos Aires, Argentina
- Height: 1.70 m (5 ft 7 in)
- Position: Defender

Team information
- Current team: Sporting Club Escaldes

Senior career*
Years	Team	Apps	(Gls)
-2012	All Boys	17	(1)
2012	San Martín de San Juan	4	(0)
2014	Independiente de Chivilcoy	12	(1)
2014	San Lorenzo de Alem	1	(0)
2015	Deportivo Merlo	41	(2)
2016	Barracas Central	9	(0)
2017	Central Norte	10	(1)
2019–2020	Engordany	24	(0)
2020–2025	Atlètic Escaldes	14	(0)
2025-	Sporting Club Escaldes	0	(0)
- * Club domestic league appearances and goals

Matías Ezequiel Rudler (born 25 April 1988) is an Argentine footballer who plays as a defender for Sporting Club Escaldes.

== Career ==
Rudler started his career with Argentine third division side All Boys where he made 17 league appearances and scored 1 goal and helped them achieve promotion to the Argentine top flight within 3 seasons.

In 2014, Rudler signed for Independiente de Chivilcoy in the Argentine fourth division after playing for Argentine top flight club San Martín de San Juan, before joining San Lorenzo de Alem in the Argentine third division.

In 2019, he signed for Andorran team Engordany.
