= Estadi Comunal =

Estadi Comunal may refer to either of two football stadiums in Andorra:

- Estadi Comunal d'Aixovall in Aixovall
- Estadi Comunal d'Andorra la Vella in Andorra la Vella
