= 1998–99 Primera Divisió =

Primera Divisió
- Season: 1998–99
- Champions: Principat
- Relegated: Extremenya; Engolasters; La Massana; Gimnàstic Valira
- UEFA Cup: Principat
- Matches played: 132
- Goals scored: 538 (4.08 per match)
- Longest unbeaten run: Principat (22 matches)

Statistics of Primera Divisió in the 1998–99 season.

== Overview ==
It was contested by 12 teams, and Principat won the championship.

== League table ==
Pos	Team	Pld	W	D	L	GF	GA	GD	Pts	Qualification or relegation
1	Principat (C)	22	20	2	0	110	10	+100	62	Qualification to UEFA Cup qualifying round
2	FC Santa Coloma	22	17	3	2	64	19	+45	54	
3	Encamp	22	13	4	5	62	30	+32	43	
4	Inter d'Escaldes	22	12	5	5	46	22	+24	41	
5	Constel·lació	22	11	2	9	52	32	+20	35	
6	Sant Julià	22	10	5	7	50	42	+8	35	
7	Benito	22	9	4	9	33	29	+4	31	
8	Sporting d'Escaldes	22	7	5	10	29	44	−15	26	
9	Extremenya (R)	22	5	1	16	23	83	−60	16	Relegation to Segona Divisió
10	Engolasters (Note: Engolasters was docked 3 points.) (R)	22	4	5	13	24	49	−25	14	Relegation to Segona Divisió
11	La Massana (R)	22	3	2	17	22	82	−60	11	Relegation to Segona Divisió
12	Gimnàstic Valira (R)	22	1	2	19	23	96	−73	5	Relegation to Segona Divisió

Rules for classification: 1) points; 2) head-to-head points; 3) head-to-head goal difference; 4) goal difference; 5) number of goals scored; 6) fair-play points; 7) playoff match
(C) Champions; (R) Relegated

== Results ==
Home \ Away	BEN	CON	ENC	EGL	EXT	GIM	INT	LMA	PRI	SFC	SJU	SPO
Benito		1–3	1–1	0–0	4–0	2–0	1–2	3–0	1–4	2–3	1–3	0–0
Constel·lació	1–0		1–3	4–0	6–0	6–1	2–3	2–1	0–3	0–2	1–2	5–0
Encamp	1–2	3–1		0–2	9–0	5–1	1–1	3–0	0–1	3–1	5–2	3–0
Engolasters	0–2	0–2	1–1		0–3	4–1	1–3	0–0	1–4	0–3	1–1	0–3
Extremenya	0–2	3–2	1–5	2–5		3–2	0–5	0–2	0–9	0–1	0–4	1–2
Gimnàstic Valira	0–2	3–5	1–6	3–1	3–3		1–3	0–4	0–11	0–2	0–3	2–2
Inter d'Escaldes	2–0	0–0	1–2	0–0	2–3	4–1		3–1	0–0	1–2	1–0	4–0
La Massana	0–2	0–6	1–4	0–3	1–2	5–1	1–5		0–10	0–2	1–3	2–2
Principat	3–2	3–0	5–1	4–0	4–0	10–1	4–1	16–0		0–0	5–0	1–0
FC Santa Coloma	4–1	2–1	3–1	3–2	6–0	10–1	1–1	5–1	0–2		5–1	2–2
Sant Julià	1–1	1–1	4–4	6–1	6–1	3–0	0–4	6–1	2–5	0–3		0–0
Sporting d'Escaldes	1–3	1–3	0–1	4–2	3–1	2–1	1–0	4–1	1–6	0–4	1–2	

Legend: Blue = home team win; Yellow = draw; Red = away team win.
