= 2003–04 Primera Divisió =

Primera Divisió
- Season: 2003–04
- Champions: FC Santa Coloma
- Relegated: Engordany
- UEFA Cup: FC Santa Coloma
- UEFA Intertoto Cup: Sant Julià
- Matches played: 80
- Goals scored: 282 (3.53 per match)

Statistics of Primera Divisió in the 2003–2004 season.

== Overview ==
It was contested by 8 teams, and FC Santa Coloma won the championship.

== First round ==
| Pos | Team | Pld | W | D | L | GF | GA | GD | Pts | Qualification |
|---|---|---|---|---|---|---|---|---|---|---|
| 1 | FC Santa Coloma | 14 | 11 | 1 | 2 | 34 | 13 | +21 | 34 | Qualification to Championship round |
| 2 | Sant Julià | 14 | 10 | 2 | 2 | 47 | 13 | +34 | 32 | Qualification to Championship round |
| 3 | Rànger's | 14 | 8 | 3 | 3 | 30 | 11 | +19 | 27 | Qualification to Championship round |
| 4 | Encamp | 14 | 7 | 3 | 4 | 27 | 11 | +16 | 24 | Qualification to Championship round |
| 5 | Principat | 14 | 6 | 2 | 6 | 29 | 31 | −2 | 20 | Qualification to Relegation round |
| 6 | Lusitans | 14 | 3 | 3 | 8 | 11 | 21 | −10 | 12 | Qualification to Relegation round |
| 7 | Inter d'Escaldes | 14 | 2 | 1 | 11 | 13 | 34 | −21 | 7 | Qualification to Relegation round |
| 8 | Engordany | 14 | 1 | 1 | 12 | 10 | 67 | −57 | 4 | Qualification to Relegation round |

Rules for classification: 1) points; 2) head-to-head points; 3) head-to-head goal difference; 4) goal difference; 5) number of goals scored; 6) fair-play points; 7) playoff match

| Home \ Away | ENC | ENG | INT | LUS | PRI | RAN | SFC | SJU |
|---|---|---|---|---|---|---|---|---|
| Encamp | | 5–1 | 2–1 | 0–0 | 0–1 | 0–0 | 4–1 | 2–3 |
| Engordany | 0–8 | | 1–2 | 0–2 | 2–2 | 1–5 | 0–9 | 0–9 |
| Inter d'Escaldes | 0–2 | 1–3 | | 1–0 | 1–2 | 0–3 | 0–1 | 1–4 |
| Lusitans | 0–1 | 2–1 | 2–1 | | 0–2 | 2–4 | 0–1 | 2–2 |
| Principat | 1–3 | 7–1 | 4–1 | 1–1 | | 1–7 | 2–3 | 1–3 |
| Rànger's | 2–0 | 2–0 | 2–2 | 2–0 | 0–1 | | 0–1 | 1–0 |
| FC Santa Coloma | 0–0 | 3–0 | 5–2 | 1–0 | 4–0 | 3–2 | | 2–1 |
| Sant Julià | 1–0 | 10–0 | 3–0 | 4–0 | 5–4 | 0–0 | 2–0 | |

Legend: Blue = home team win; Yellow = draw; Red = away team win.

== Second round ==
=== Championship Round ===
| Pos | Team | Pld | W | D | L | GF | GA | GD | Pts | Qualification |
|---|---|---|---|---|---|---|---|---|---|---|
| 1 | FC Santa Coloma (C) | 20 | 14 | 3 | 3 | 44 | 21 | +23 | 45 | Qualification to UEFA Cup first qualifying round |
| 2 | Sant Julià | 20 | 13 | 4 | 3 | 57 | 18 | +39 | 43 | Qualification to Intertoto Cup first round |
| 3 | Rànger's | 20 | 10 | 4 | 6 | 34 | 17 | +17 | 34 | |
| 4 | Encamp | 20 | 8 | 4 | 8 | 31 | 20 | +11 | 28 | |

Rules for classification: 1) points; 2) head-to-head points; 3) head-to-head goal difference; 4) goal difference; 5) number of goals scored; 6) fair-play points; 7) playoff match
(C) Champions

| Home \ Away | ENC | RAN | SFC | SJU |
|---|---|---|---|---|
| Encamp | | 0–0 | 0–1 | 0–4 |
| Rànger's | 1–0 | | 1–3 | 0–1 |
| FC Santa Coloma | 1–3 | 2–1 | | 2–2 |
| Sant Julià | 2–1 | 0–1 | 1–1 | |

Legend: Blue = home team win; Yellow = draw; Red = away team win.

=== Relegation Round ===
| Pos | Team | Pld | W | D | L | GF | GA | GD | Pts | Relegation |
|---|---|---|---|---|---|---|---|---|---|---|
| 1 | Principat | 20 | 9 | 4 | 7 | 52 | 41 | +11 | 31 | |
| 2 | Lusitans | 20 | 5 | 6 | 9 | 24 | 29 | −5 | 21 | |
| 3 | Inter d'Escaldes | 20 | 3 | 3 | 14 | 20 | 43 | −23 | 12 | |
| 4 | Engordany (R) | 20 | 3 | 2 | 15 | 20 | 93 | −73 | 11 | Relegation to Segona Divisió |

Rules for classification: 1) points; 2) head-to-head points; 3) head-to-head goal difference; 4) goal difference; 5) number of goals scored; 6) fair-play points; 7) playoff match
(R) Relegated

| Home \ Away | ENG | INT | LUS | PRI |
|---|---|---|---|---|
| Engordany | | 2–1 | 1–1 | 0–12 |
| Inter d'Escaldes | 3–2 | | 1–1 | 0–1 |
| Lusitans | 6–1 | 1–0 | | 2–2 |
| Principat | 3–4 | 2–2 | 3–2 | |

Legend: Blue = home team win; Yellow = draw; Red = away team win.
