= Principat =

Principat is the word for principality in the Catalan language and most Occitan varieties. A few entities with this name are:

- Principality of Catalonia (Catalan: Principat de Catalunya), a state that existed from the 12-18th centuries.
- Principality of Monaco (Occitan: Principat de Mónegue)
- Principality of Andorra (Catalan: Principat d'Andorra)
- CE Principat, a former Andorran football club
