= UE Engordany in European football =

- Club: UE Engordany
- First entry: 2018–19 UEFA Europa League
- Latest entry: 2020–21 UEFA Europa League

UE Engordany, an Andorran football club, has played in European football since 2018, in the Europa League.

== Overall record ==
Accurate as of 18 August 2020

Competition	Pld	W	D	L	GF	GA	GD	W%
UEFA Europa League	9	3	1	5	8	23	−15	33.33
Total	9	3	1	5	8	23	−15	33.33

== Matches ==
Season	Competition	Round	Club	Home	Away	Agg.
2018–19	2018–19 UEFA Europa League	PR	(San Marino) Folgore	2–1	1–1	3–2
2018–19	2018–19 UEFA Europa League	1QR	(Kazakhstan) Kairat	0–3	1–7	1–10
2019–20	2019–20 UEFA Europa League	PR	(San Marino) La Fiorita	2–1	1–0	3–1
2019–20	2019–20 UEFA Europa League	1QR	(Georgia (country)) Dinamo Tbilisi	0–1	0–6	0–7
2020–21	2020–21 UEFA Europa League	PR	(Montenegro) Zeta	1–3		
