= 2005–06 Primera Divisió =

Primera Divisió
- Season: 2005–06
- Champions: Rànger's
- Relegated: Extremenya
- UEFA Cup: Rànger's
- UEFA Intertoto Cup: Sant Julià
- Matches played: 80
- Goals scored: 291 (3.64 per match)

Statistics of Primera Divisió in the 2005–2006 season.

== Overview ==
It was contested by 8 teams, and FC Rànger's won the championship.

== First round ==
Pos	Team	Pld	W	D	L	GF	GA	GD	Pts	Qualification
1	Rànger's	14	12	1	1	62	7	+55	37	Qualification to Championship round
2	Sant Julià	14	10	2	2	53	12	+41	32	Qualification to Championship round
3	FC Santa Coloma	14	9	1	4	41	12	+29	28	Qualification to Championship round
4	Lusitans	14	8	0	6	26	29	−3	24	Qualification to Championship round
5	Inter d'Escaldes	14	7	2	5	22	23	−1	23	Qualification to Relegation round
6	Atlètic d'Escaldes	14	3	3	8	10	24	−14	12	Qualification to Relegation round
7	Principat	14	1	2	11	12	45	−33	5	Qualification to Relegation round
8	Extremenya	14	0	1	13	9	83	−74	1	Qualification to Relegation round

Rules for classification: 1) points; 2) head-to-head points; 3) head-to-head goal difference; 4) goal difference; 5) number of goals scored; 6) fair-play points; 7) playoff match

Home \ Away	ATL	EXT	INT	LUS	PRI	RAN	SFC	SJU
Atlètic d'Escaldes		2–0	0–1	0–1	0–0	0–0	0–2	1–3
Extremenya	1–4		0–2	2–3	1–1	0–14	0–8	0–9
Inter d'Escaldes	0–0	3–1		0–1	5–1	1–4	0–1	2–2
Lusitans	2–1	6–1	0–1		3–1	1–7	1–3	1–6
Principat	0–1	5–2	1–4	2–4		1–5	0–2	0–5
Rànger's	7–0	7–1	4–0	2–0	6–0		2–0	1–3
FC Santa Coloma	2–1	9–0	3–1	0–2	5–0	0–1		2–2
Sant Julià	5–0	10–0	1–2	3–1	2–0	0–2	2–0	

Legend: Blue = home team win; Yellow = draw; Red = away team win.

== Second round ==
=== Championship Round ===
Pos	Team	Pld	W	D	L	GF	GA	GD	Pts	Qualification
1	Rànger's (C)	20	16	3	1	73	12	+61	51	Qualification to UEFA Cup first qualifying round
2	Sant Julià	20	12	3	5	61	19	+42	39	Qualification to Intertoto Cup first round
3	FC Santa Coloma	20	11	3	6	47	17	+30	36	
4	Lusitans	20	9	1	10	30	41	−11	28	

Rules for classification: 1) points; 2) head-to-head points; 3) head-to-head goal difference; 4) goal difference; 5) number of goals scored; 6) fair-play points; 7) playoff match
(C) Champions

Home \ Away	LUS	RAN	SFC	SJU
Lusitans		0–2	1–1	1–0
Rànger's	3–1		1–1	2–1
FC Santa Coloma	1–0	1–2		2–0
Sant Julià	5–1	1–1	1–0	

Legend: Blue = home team win; Yellow = draw; Red = away team win.

=== Relegation round ===
Pos	Team	Pld	W	D	L	GF	GA	GD	Pts	Qualification or relegation
1	Inter d'Escaldes	20	11	3	6	36	28	+8	36	
2	Atlètic d'Escaldes	20	8	4	8	21	27	−6	28	
3	Principat (O)	20	3	2	15	18	55	−37	11	Qualification to relegation play-offs
4	Extremenya (R)	20	0	1	19	11	98	−87	1	Relegation to Segona Divisió

Rules for classification: 1) points; 2) head-to-head points; 3) head-to-head goal difference; 4) goal difference; 5) number of goals scored; 6) fair-play points; 7) playoff match
(O) Play-off winners; (R) Relegated

Home \ Away	ATL	EXT	INT	PRI
Atlètic d'Escaldes		3–0 (Note: The match between Atlètic d'Escaldes and Extremenya was rated with 3–0 because the away team did not appear.)	1–0	2–0
Extremenya	0–1		1–4	1–3
Inter d'Escaldes	2–2	3–0		2–1
Principat	1–2	1–0	0–3	

Legend: Blue = home team win; Yellow = draw; Red = away team win.
