= 2013–14 Primera Divisió =

Primera Divisió
- Season: 2013–14
- Champions: FC Santa Coloma
- Relegated: CE Principat
- Champions League: FC Santa Coloma
- Europa League: UE Santa Coloma
- Matches: 56
- Goals: 165 (2.95 per match)
- Top goalscorer: (Portugal) Luís dos Reis (Lusitanos, 13 goals)
- Biggest home win: Lusitanos 8–0 Encamp; FC Santa Coloma 8–0 Principat
- Biggest away win: Encamp 0–7 FC Santa Coloma
- Highest scoring: Lusitanos 8–0 Encamp; FC Santa Coloma 8–0 Principat

The 2013–14 Primera Divisió is the nineteenth season of top-tier football in Andorra. It began on September 22, 2013, and will end in April 2014. The defending champions are FC Lusitanos, who won their second championship in the previous season.

== Stadia and locations ==
Location of teams in 2013-14 Primera Divisió

Andorra la Vella teams:
FC Lusitanos
CE Principat

Santa Coloma teams:
FC Santa Coloma
UE Santa Coloma

Team	Home town	Stadium	Capacity
FC Encamp	Encamp	DEVK-Arena	1,000
Inter Club d'Escaldes	Escaldes	DEVK-Arena	1,000
FC Lusitanos	Andorra la Vella	DEVK-Arena	1,000
FC Ordino	Ordino	DEVK-Arena	1,000
CE Principat	Andorra la Vella	DEVK-Arena	1,000
UE Sant Julià	Sant Julià de Lòria	DEVK-Arena	1,000
FC Santa Coloma	Santa Coloma	DEVK-Arena	1,000
UE Santa Coloma	Santa Coloma	DEVK-Arena	1,000

== Competition format ==
The participating teams first played a conventional round-robin schedule with every team playing each opponent once "home" and once "away" (in actuality, the designation of home and away was purely arbitrary as the clubs did not have their own grounds) for a total of 14 games. The league was then split up in two groups of four teams with each of them playing teams within their group in a home-and-away cycle of games. The top four teams competed for the championship. The bottom four clubs played for one direct relegation spot and one relegation play-off spot. Records earned in the First Round were taken over to the respective Second Rounds.

== Promotion and relegation from 2012–13 ==
UE Engordany were relegated after last season due to finishing in 8th place. They were replaced by Segona Divisió champions FC Ordino.

FC Encamp, who finished last season in 7th place, and 4th place (2nd and 3rd were B teams) Segona Divisió club Atlètic Club d'Escaldes played a two-legged relegation play-off. FC Encamp won the playoff, 8–1 on aggregate, and remained in the Primera Divisió while Atlètic Club d'Escaldes remained in the Segona Divisió.

== First round ==
Pos	Team	Pld	W	D	L	GF	GA	GD	Pts	Qualification
1	FC Santa Coloma	14	10	2	2	41	7	+34	32	Qualification to Championship round
2	Lusitanos	14	10	0	4	50	11	+39	30	Qualification to Championship round
3	Sant Julià	14	9	3	2	41	14	+27	30	Qualification to Championship round
4	UE Santa Coloma	14	9	2	3	35	17	+18	29	Qualification to Championship round
5	Ordino	14	6	2	6	26	27	−1	20	Qualification to Relegation round
6	Encamp	14	4	1	9	21	47	−26	13	Qualification to Relegation round
7	Inter Club d'Escaldes	14	2	1	11	11	41	−30	7	Qualification to Relegation round
8	Principat	14	0	1	13	1	62	−61	1	Qualification to Relegation round

Source: Visualització de Partits (in Catalan)
Rules for classification: 1) points; 2) goal difference; 3) number of goals scored.

Home \ Away	ENC	INT	LUS	ORD	PRI	SJU	SFC	SUE
Encamp		3–2	1–6	0–1	0–0	1–2	0–7	2–3
Inter Club d'Escaldes	2–4		0–4	1–5	1–0	0–6	0–3	0–4
Lusitanos	8–0	4–0		1–2	6–0	3–2	3–1	5–0
Ordino	4–0	1–1	1–5		2–1	1–3	1–4	0–1
Principat	0–5	0–3	0–5	0–5		0–4	0–4	0–5
Sant Julià	6–0	2–0	1–0	3–3	7–0		0–2	2–1
FC Santa Coloma	1–3	3–0	2–0	4–0	8–0	0–0		2–0
UE Santa Coloma	5–2	2–1	1–0	3–0	7–0	3–3	0–0	

Source: Visualització de Partits (in Catalan)
Legend: Blue = home team win; Yellow = draw; Red = away team win.

== Second round ==
=== Championship round ===
Pos	Team	Pld	W	D	L	GF	GA	GD	Pts	Qualification
1	FC Santa Coloma (C)	20	13	3	4	50	12	+38	42	Qualification to Champions League first qualifying round
2	UE Santa Coloma	20	12	3	5	40	24	+16	39	Qualification to Europa League first qualifying round
3	Sant Julià	20	11	5	4	46	19	+27	38	Qualification to Europa League first qualifying round
4	Lusitanos	20	11	2	7	57	20	+37	35	

Source: Visualització de Partits (in Catalan)
Rules for classification: 1) points; 2) goal difference; 3) number of goals scored.
(C) Champions

Home \ Away	LUS	SJU	SFC	SUE
Lusitanos		1–2	1–3	1–1
Sant Julià	1–1		0–0	1–0
FC Santa Coloma	0–2	2–1		0–1
UE Santa Coloma	2–1	1–0	0–4	

Source: Visualització de Partits (in Catalan)
Legend: Blue = home team win; Yellow = draw; Red = away team win.

=== Relegation round ===
Pos	Team	Pld	W	D	L	GF	GA	GD	Pts	Qualification or relegation
1	Ordino	20	9	5	6	41	34	+7	32	
2	Encamp	20	7	4	9	34	53	−19	25	
3	Inter Club d'Escaldes (O)	20	3	2	15	16	55	−39	11	Qualification to relegation play-offs
4	Principat (R)	20	1	2	17	8	75	−67	5	Relegation to Segona Divisió

Source: Federació Andorrana de Futbol (in Catalan)
Rules for classification: 1) points; 2) goal difference; 3) number of goals scored.
(O) Play-off winners; (R) Relegated

Home \ Away	ORD	ENC	INT	PRI
Ordino		2–2	1–1	3–2
Encamp	1–1		3–0	2–2
Inter Club d'Escaldes	1–4	1–3		1–3
Principat	0–4	0–2	0–1	

Source: Visualització de Partits (in Catalan)
Legend: Blue = home team win; Yellow = draw; Red = away team win.

== Relegation play-off ==
The seventh-placed club in the league will compete in a two-legged relegation play-off against the runners-up of the 2013–14 Segona Divisió, for one spot in 2014–15 Primera Divisió.

11 May 2014
18:00

Inter Club d'Escaldes	4 – 0	CE Jenlai
Rodriguez 18', 45'; Martin 27', 90+1'

DEVK-Arena, Sant Julià de Lòria

18 May 2014
18:00

CE Jenlai	1 – 2	Inter Club d'Escaldes
Pajares 36'		Marinho 71'; Andrés 87'

DEVK-Arena, Sant Julià de Lòria

Inter Club d'Escaldes won 6-1 on aggregate

== Top scorers ==
Player	Team	Goals (penalty)	Matches
(Portugal) Luis Miguel dos Reis	FC Lusitans	13 (1)	20
(Portugal) Bruno Raposo (Bruninho)	FC Lusitans	11	20
(Portugal) Lionel Antonio Correia Alves	FC Encamp	10	15
(Andorra) Carlos Manuel Gomes	FC Ordino	10	19
(Andorra) Marc Pujol	FC Santa Coloma	10 (1)	17
