= Víctor Bernat =

Andorran footballer

Personal information
- Full name: Víctor Bernat Cuadros
- Date of birth: 17 May 1987 (age 39)
- Place of birth: Barcelona, Spain
- Position: Forward

Team information
- Current team: Casa de Portugal
- Number: 14

Senior career*
Years	Team	Apps	(Gls)
–2007	Engordany		
2007–2021	UE Santa Coloma	148	(64)
2021–2022	Ordino	21	(4)
2022–2023	Engordany	20	(3)
2023–2024	Penya Encarnada	11	(0)
2024–2025	La Massana	12	(2)
2025–	Casa de Portugal	0	(0)

International career^{‡}
2020–	Andorra	21	(1)
- * Club domestic league appearances and goals as of 9 March 2025 ‡ National team caps and goals as of 21 March 2025

Víctor Bernat Cuadros (born 17 May 1987) is an Andorran footballer who plays as a forward for La Massana and the Andorra national team.

== Career ==
Bernat made his international debut for Andorra on 6 September 2020 in the UEFA Nations League against the Faroe Islands.

== Career statistics ==
=== International ===
As of 21 March 2025

Andorra
Year	Apps	Goals
2020	5	0
2021	3	0
2022	9	1
2023	3	0
Total	21	1

=== International goals ===
Scores and results list Andorra's goal tally first.

No.	Date	Venue	Opponent	Score	Result	Competition
1.	28 March 2022	Estadi Nacional, Andorra la Vella, Andorra	Grenada	1–0	1–0	Friendly
