= 2000–01 Primera Divisió =

Primera Divisió
- Season: 2000–01
- Dates: 16 September 2000 – 27 May 2001
- Champions: FC Santa Coloma
- Relegated: La Massana
- UEFA Cup: FC Santa Coloma
- UEFA Intertoto Cup: Sant Julià
- Matches played: 80
- Goals scored: 282 (3.53 per match)

Statistics of Primera Divisió in the 2000–01 season.

== Overview ==
It was contested by 8 teams, and FC Santa Coloma won the championship.

== First round ==
| Pos | Team | Pld | W | D | L | GF | GA | GD | Pts | Qualification |
|---|---|---|---|---|---|---|---|---|---|---|
| 1 | Sant Julià | 14 | 12 | 0 | 2 | 47 | 16 | +31 | 36 | Qualification to Championship round |
| 2 | FC Santa Coloma | 14 | 9 | 4 | 1 | 29 | 14 | +15 | 31 | Qualification to Championship round |
| 3 | Inter d'Escaldes | 14 | 5 | 4 | 5 | 25 | 22 | +3 | 19 | Qualification to Championship round |
| 4 | Principat | 14 | 5 | 4 | 5 | 20 | 24 | −4 | 19 | Qualification to Championship round |
| 5 | Encamp | 14 | 5 | 3 | 6 | 25 | 29 | −4 | 18 | Qualification to Relegation round |
| 6 | Lusitans | 14 | 3 | 3 | 8 | 21 | 37 | −16 | 12 | Qualification to Relegation round |
| 7 | La Massana | 14 | 2 | 5 | 7 | 17 | 30 | −13 | 11 | Qualification to Relegation round |
| 8 | Sporting d'Escaldes | 14 | 1 | 5 | 8 | 21 | 33 | −12 | 8 | Qualification to Relegation round |

Rules for classification: 1) points; 2) head-to-head points; 3) head-to-head goal difference; 4) goal difference; 5) number of goals scored; 6) fair-play points; 7) playoff match

| Home \ Away | ENC | INT | LMA | LUS | PRI | SFC | SJU | SPO |
|---|---|---|---|---|---|---|---|---|
| Encamp | | 2–1 | 3–2 | 2–4 | 4–1 | 1–1 | 1–5 | 4–0 |
| Inter d'Escaldes | 0–0 | | 3–0 | 4–2 | 1–1 | 1–2 | 0–2 | 2–1 |
| La Massana | 3–2 | 1–1 | | 1–2 | 0–3 | 1–1 | 1–2 | 3–3 |
| Lusitans | 1–3 | 2–3 | 0–0 | | 2–2 | 2–5 | 0–3 | 1–1 |
| Principat | 3–1 | 2–1 | 0–1 | 2–1 | | 0–0 | 0–6 | 2–2 |
| FC Santa Coloma | 0–0 | 1–4 | 1–0 | 5–1 | 1–0 | | 5–3 | 3–1 |
| Sant Julià | 3–1 | 4–2 | 7–2 | 4–0 | 3–2 | 0–1 | | 3–0 |
| Sporting d'Escaldes | 5–1 | 2–2 | 2–2 | 2–3 | 1–2 | 0–3 | 1–2 | |

Legend: Blue = home team win; Yellow = draw; Red = away team win.

== Second round ==
=== Championship Round ===
| Pos | Team | Pld | W | D | L | GF | GA | GD | Pts | Qualification |
|---|---|---|---|---|---|---|---|---|---|---|
| 1 | FC Santa Coloma (C) | 6 | 4 | 1 | 1 | 15 | 6 | +9 | 24 | Qualification to UEFA Cup qualifying round |
| 2 | Sant Julià | 6 | 3 | 1 | 2 | 11 | 7 | +4 | 22 | Qualification to Intertoto Cup first round |
| 3 | Inter d'Escaldes | 6 | 1 | 2 | 3 | 5 | 11 | −6 | 12 | |
| 4 | Principat | 6 | 1 | 2 | 3 | 4 | 11 | −7 | 12 | |

Rules for classification: 1) points; 2) head-to-head points; 3) head-to-head goal difference; 4) goal difference; 5) number of goals scored; 6) fair-play points; 7) playoff match
(C) Champions

| Home \ Away | INT | PRI | SFC | SJU |
|---|---|---|---|---|
| Inter d'Escaldes | | 2–0 | 2–3 | 0–0 |
| Principat | 1–1 | | 1–1 | 0–1 |
| FC Santa Coloma | 1–0 | 5–0 | | 1–3 |
| Sant Julià | 6–0 | 1–2 | 0–4 | |

Legend: Blue = home team win; Yellow = draw; Red = away team win.

=== Relegation Round ===
| Pos | Team | Pld | W | D | L | GF | GA | GD | Pts | Relegation |
|---|---|---|---|---|---|---|---|---|---|---|
| 1 | Lusitans | 6 | 4 | 2 | 0 | 14 | 5 | +9 | 19 | |
| 2 | Sporting d'Escaldes | 6 | 4 | 0 | 2 | 14 | 6 | +8 | 16 | |
| 3 | Encamp | 6 | 1 | 2 | 3 | 9 | 12 | −3 | 12 | |
| 4 | La Massana (R) | 6 | 0 | 2 | 4 | 5 | 19 | −14 | 7 | Relegation to Segona Divisió |

Rules for classification: 1) points; 2) head-to-head points; 3) head-to-head goal difference; 4) goal difference; 5) number of goals scored; 6) fair-play points; 7) playoff match
(R) Relegated

| Home \ Away | ENC | LMA | LUS | SPO |
|---|---|---|---|---|
| Encamp | | 0–0 | 1–1 | 1–2 |
| La Massana | 2–5 | | 1–1 | 0–3 |
| Lusitans | 3–1 | 6–1 | | 2–1 |
| Sporting d'Escaldes | 4–1 | 4–1 | 0–1 | |

Legend: Blue = home team win; Yellow = draw; Red = away team win.
