= 2006–07 Primera Divisió =

Primera Divisió
- Season: 2006–07
- Champions: Rànger's
- Relegated: Atlètic d'Escaldes
- Champions League: Rànger's
- UEFA Cup: FC Santa Coloma
- UEFA Intertoto Cup: Sant Julià
- Matches played: 80
- Goals scored: 227 (2.84 per match)

Statistics of Primera Divisió in the 2006–2007 season.

== Overview ==
It was contested by 8 teams, and FC Rànger's won the championship.

== First round ==
Pos	Team	Pld	W	D	L	GF	GA	GD	Pts	Qualification
1	Rànger's	14	12	1	1	42	8	+34	37	Qualification to Championship round
2	FC Santa Coloma	14	12	1	1	35	10	+25	37	Qualification to Championship round
3	Sant Julià	14	7	3	4	29	12	+17	24	Qualification to Championship round
4	Lusitans	14	6	2	6	19	20	−1	20	Qualification to Championship round
5	Principat	14	4	3	7	15	33	−18	15	Qualification to Relegation round
6	Inter d'Escaldes	14	3	3	8	14	28	−14	12	Qualification to Relegation round
7	Encamp	14	1	4	9	13	30	−17	7	Qualification to Relegation round
8	Atlètic d'Escaldes	14	1	3	10	13	39	−26	6	Qualification to Relegation round

Rules for classification: 1) points; 2) head-to-head points; 3) head-to-head goal difference; 4) goal difference; 5) number of goals scored; 6) fair-play points; 7) playoff match

Home \ Away	ATL	ENC	INT	LUS	PRI	RAN	SFC	SJU
Atlètic d'Escaldes		1–4	3–2	0–1	3–3	2–8	0–5	0–2
Encamp	1–1		1–1	1–2	1–1	0–3	2–3	0–0
Inter d'Escaldes	2–1	2–1		1–0	2–3	0–1	0–4	0–0
Lusitans	0–0	5–0	3–1		2–1	1–2	1–3	1–5
Principat	3–1	2–0	1–1	0–3 (Note: The match between Principat between Lusitans was canceled when the score was 0–2 in the 77th minute and scored 0–3 for Lusitans.)		0–4	0–3	1–0
Rànger's	2–0	4–0	4–0	3–0	4–0		1–2	2–1
FC Santa Coloma	2–0	2–1	4–2	3–0	2–0	0–0		1–0
Sant Julià	4–1	3–1	2–0	0–0	7–0	2–4	3–1	

Legend: Blue = home team win; Yellow = draw; Red = away team win.

== Second round ==
=== Championship Round ===
Pos	Team	Pld	W	D	L	GF	GA	GD	Pts	Qualification
1	Rànger's (C)	20	17	2	1	60	11	+49	53	Qualification to Champions League first qualifying round
2	FC Santa Coloma	20	14	2	4	41	17	+24	44	Qualification to UEFA Cup first qualifying round
3	Sant Julià	20	10	4	6	38	17	+21	34	Qualification to Intertoto Cup first round
4	Lusitans	20	6	3	11	22	41	−19	21	

Rules for classification: 1) points; 2) head-to-head points; 3) head-to-head goal difference; 4) goal difference; 5) number of goals scored; 6) fair-play points; 7) playoff match
(C) Champions

Home \ Away	LUS	RAN	SFC	SJU
Lusitans		0–7	0–2	0–1
Rànger's	7–2		1–0	1–1
FC Santa Coloma	1–1	0–1		1–4
Sant Julià	3–0	1–0	0–2	

Legend: Blue = home team win; Yellow = draw; Red = away team win.

=== Relegation Round ===
Pos	Team	Pld	W	D	L	GF	GA	GD	Pts	Qualification or relegation
1	Inter d'Escaldes	20	7	3	10	20	32	−12	24	
2	Principat	20	5	4	11	21	43	−22	19	
3	Encamp (R)	20	4	5	11	19	34	−15	17	Qualification to relegation play-offs
4	Atlètic d'Escaldes (R)	20	4	3	13	18	44	−26	15	Relegation to Segona Divisió

Rules for classification: 1) points; 2) head-to-head points; 3) head-to-head goal difference; 4) goal difference; 5) number of goals scored; 6) fair-play points; 7) playoff match
(R) Relegated

Home \ Away	ATL	ENC	INT	PRI
Atlètic d'Escaldes		0–1	0–2	2–1
Encamp	0–1		0–1	2–0
Inter d'Escaldes	1–0	0–1		1–0
Principat	0–2	2–2	3–1	

Legend: Blue = home team win; Yellow = draw; Red = away team win.
