= 1996–97 Primera Divisió =

Primera Divisió
- Season: 1996–97
- Champions: Principat
- UEFA Cup: Principat
- Matches played: 132
- Goals scored: 599 (4.54 per match)
- Longest winless run: Spordany Juvenil (22 matches)
- Longest losing run: Spordany Juvenil (22 matches)

Statistics of Primera Divisió for the 1996–97 season.

== Overview ==
It was contested by 12 teams, and Principat won the championship.

== League table ==
Pos	Team	Pld	W	D	L	GF	GA	GD	Pts	Qualification or relegation
1	Principat (C)	22	20	1	1	115	12	+103	61	Qualification to UEFA Cup first qualifying round
2	Veterans Andorra	22	19	2	1	84	25	+59	59	
3	Encamp	22	12	5	5	66	25	+41	41	
4	FC Santa Coloma	22	10	3	9	57	31	+26	33	
5	Aldosa	22	10	3	9	34	37	−3	33	
6	Sporting d'Escaldes	22	8	6	8	51	39	+12	30	
7	Sant Julià	22	9	3	10	38	52	−14	30	
8	La Massana	22	6	7	9	32	43	−11	25	
9	Inter d'Escaldes	22	7	4	11	31	48	−17	25	
10	Les Bons	22	6	4	12	37	66	−29	22	
11	Gimnàstic Valira	22	4	4	14	31	84	−53	16	
12	Spordany Juvenil	22	0	0	22	23	137	−114	0	

Rules for classification: 1) points; 2) head-to-head points; 3) head-to-head goal difference; 4) goal difference; 5) number of goals scored; 6) fair-play points; 7) playoff match
(C) Champions

== Results ==
Home \ Away	ALD	ENC	GIM	INT	LMA	LBO	PRI	SFC	SJU	JUV	SPO	VET
Aldosa		0–3	1–0	1–0	3–3	3–0	0–5	1–0	1–0	5–1	1–1	0–3
Encamp	3–0		4–0	0–1	2–0	2–2	1–1	0–1	7–2	8–0	3–0	5–6
Gimnàstic Valira	1–6	1–6		4–1	0–0	1–1	0–9	1–8	0–3	10–0	1–1	1–9
Inter d'Escaldes	0–4	2–0	5–1		0–0	2–1	0–4	3–4	1–1	2–1	0–1	1–6
La Massana	3–0	2–2	4–1	0–1		3–0	1–2	1–5	1–1	4–3	1–1	0–4
Les Bons	2–0	0–5	1–1	3–2	2–2		1–8	3–1	4–1	6–0	0–3	2–6
Principat	7–0	3–0	8–1	6–2	5–0	9–0		1–0 (Note: Match rated due to the use of an unauthorized player.)	7–1	12–0	2–0	6–1
FC Santa Coloma	2–1	1–1	11–0	1–1	0–2	3–1	0–1		0–2	5–2	3–1	0–1
Sant Julià	0–2	0–3	3–0	4–2	2–1	2–1	0–5	2–0		4–1	1–5	0–2
Spordany Juvenil	1–4	0–5	1–4	3–4	2–3	1–4	0–8	1–10	2–6		2–7	1–6
Sporting d'Escaldes	2–1	2–5	0–2	0–0	5–1	6–3	1–5	1–1	2–2	10–0		2–3
Veterans Andorra	0–0	1–1	2–1	3–1	2–0	5–0	3–1	4–1	5–1	10–1	2–0	

Legend: Blue = home team win; Yellow = draw; Red = away team win.
