= 1997–98 Primera Divisió =

Primera Divisió
- Season: 1997–98
- Champions: Principat
- UEFA Cup: Principat
- Matches played: 110
- Goals scored: 482 (4.38 per match)
- Longest unbeaten run: Principat (20 matches)

Statistics of Primera Divisió for the 1997–98 season.

== Overview ==
It was contested by 11 teams, and Principat won the championship.

== League table ==
Pos	Team	Pld	W	D	L	GF	GA	GD	Pts	Qualification or relegation
1	Principat (C)	20	18	2	0	89	9	+80	56	Qualification to UEFA Cup first qualifying round
2	FC Santa Coloma	20	18	1	1	99	11	+88	55	
3	Encamp	20	11	5	4	57	27	+30	38	
4	Inter d'Escaldes	20	11	2	7	34	28	+6	35	
5	Sporting d'Escaldes	20	7	4	9	37	63	−26	25	
6	Engolasters	20	7	3	10	30	45	−15	24	
7	Benito	20	7	2	11	30	52	−22	23	
8	La Massana	20	6	4	10	24	39	−15	22	
9	Sant Julià	20	6	2	12	35	54	−19	20	
10	Veterans Andorra	20	3	3	14	20	70	−50	12	
11	Gimnàstic Valira	20	2	0	18	27	84	−57	6	

Rules for classification: 1) points; 2) head-to-head points; 3) head-to-head goal difference; 4) goal difference; 5) number of goals scored; 6) fair-play points; 7) playoff match
(C) Champions

== Results ==
Home \ Away	BEN	ENC	EGL	GIM	INT	LMA	PRI	SFC	SJU	SPO	VET
Benito		0–3	1–0	2–1	1–0	0–6	1–9	0–4	0–2	0–4	3–0
Encamp	6–0		2–2	6–2	1–0	1–0	0–2	2–5	2–0	3–3	8–1
Engolasters	3–1	1–6		3–2	0–2	3–0	1–2	0–8	2–0	2–4	3–1
Gimnàstic Valira	2–5	0–4	0–5		1–2	1–2	0–12	0–4	0–2	0–4	0–2
Inter d'Escaldes	1–0	2–2	1–2	2–1		0–0	1–7	1–5	3–0	5–1	4–0
La Massana	1–1	1–1	2–0	2–10	0–1		0–5	0–1	1–0	1–1	0–2
Principat	4–2	1–1	7–1	6–0	2–1	3–0		1–0	2–0	6–0	7–0
FC Santa Coloma	2–1	2–1	3–0	11–0	3–0	3–0	0–0		6–2	12–0	7–0
Sant Julià	3–6	3–1	1–1	4–2	1–4	2–4	0–1	2–10		1–1	6–3
Sporting d'Escaldes	0–5	2–4	1–0	5–1	1–3	2–1	1–7	1–5	2–4		1–1
Veterans Andorra	1–1	0–3	1–1	1–4	0–1	2–3	0–5	0–8	3–2	2–3	

Legend: Blue = home team win; Yellow = draw; Red = away team win.
