= 1995–96 Primera Divisió =

Primera Divisió
- Season: 1995–96
- Champions: FC Encamp
- Matches played: 90
- Goals scored: 425 (4.72 per match)

The 1995-96 Primera Divisió was the inaugural season of Primera Divisió, the highest football league in Andorra. FC Encamp became the champion, finishing two points ahead of CE Principat. Construccions Emprim withdrew from the league after the season. No teams were relegated, as the Segona Divisió was introduced in 1999.

== League table ==
Pos	Team	Pld	W	D	L	GF	GA	GD	Pts	Qualification
1	FC Encamp (C)	18	15	2	1	64	18	+46	47	Champion
2	CE Principat	18	14	3	1	85	22	+63	45	
3	FC Santa Coloma	18	13	3	2	52	26	+26	42	
4	FC Montanbaldosa	18	9	1	8	36	29	+7	28	
5	Deportivo La Massana	18	7	3	8	26	36	−10	24	
6	Sporting Club d'Engordany	18	7	2	9	38	35	+3	23	
7	Construccions Modern	18	6	1	11	44	36	+8	19	
8	UE Sant Julià	18	4	4	10	37	44	−7	16	
9	Spordany Juvenil	18	4	0	14	25	101	−76	12	
10	Construccions Emprim (E)	18	1	1	16	18	78	−60	4	Withdrew from Primera Divisió after the season.

Rules for classification: 1) points; 2) head-to-head points; 3) head-to-head goal difference; 4) goal difference; 5) number of goals scored; 6) fair-play points; 7) playoff match
(C) Champions; (E) Eliminated
