= Sporting Club d'Escaldes =

- Founded: 1977; 49 years ago
- Owner: Vinsky
- League: Primera Divisió
- 2025–26: Segona Divisió, 2nd (promoted)

Sporting Club d'Escaldes is an Andorran football club from Les Escaldes. The club plays in the Primera Divisió, having been promoted from the Segonda Divisió in 2025–26.

== History ==
Founded as Sporting Club d'Engordany in 1977, the club entered the Primera Divisió in its debut season of 1995–96, was renamed in 1998, and remained in the top flight until being relegated in last place in 2001–02. The club remained in the Segona Divisió until 2008, and made a brief comeback in 2018–19, when it won one game all season and finished last, excluding withdrawn club CE Jenlai.

In February 2025, French YouTuber Vinsky bought the club, which had been dormant since 2019, and registered it to compete in the Segona Divisió in 2025–26. He set a three-year target of qualifying for Europe. In their debut campaign, the team fought for the title against CE Casa de Portugal, who ended the season as champions and won promotion. The club played a promotion/relegation playoff against CF Esperança d'Andorra, losing 5–1 on aggregate. In July 2026, UE Santa Coloma was administratively relegated from the top flight, and Sporting Club d'Escaldes took its place.
