= Primera Divisió =

Top division men's association football league in Andorra

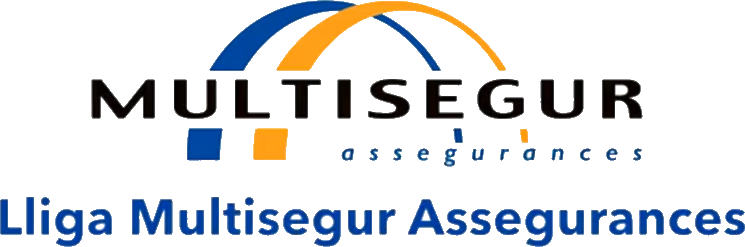
- Founded: 1995
- Country: Andorra
- Confederation: UEFA
- Number of clubs: 10
- Level on pyramid: 1
- Relegation to: Segona Divisió
- Domestic cup(s): Copa Constitució; Supercopa Andorrana
- International cup(s): UEFA Champions League; UEFA Conference League
- Current champions: Inter Club d'Escaldes (5th title) (2025–26)
- Most championships: FC Santa Coloma (13 titles)
- Website: www.faf.ad
- Current: 2026–27 Primera Divisió

The Primera Divisió (First Division), also known as Lliga Multisegur Assegurances for sponsorship reasons is the top level of men's football in Andorra.

The league was launched in 1995 sponsored by the local federation (Andorran Football Federation) which was created just one year before. Until then, clubs had played since 1970 in an amateur league without a structure or affiliation with any official institution. Since affiliation to UEFA and FIFA in 1996, Andorran clubs are able to compete in the UEFA competitions. Until 2015 the league was known as Lliga Grup Becier and during 2016 Lliga Grup Sant Eloi. It was renamed in 2017 as Lliga Multisegur Assegurances for sponsorship reasons.

All the teams in the league play in the same stadiums owned by the federation. The same occurs in all other Andorran competitions, such as the Copa Constitució and Supercopa.

FC Andorra, one of the major clubs in the country based in Andorra la Vella, have never played in this league; they play in the Spanish league system, and are registered with the Royal Spanish Football Federation.

== League system ==
The eight clubs that play in the league play each other three times in the same venue. After the first 21 rounds, the league splits in half, into a top four and bottom four. They then play the other three teams in their section twice more to give a total of 27 games. The last placed of the relegation round is relegated to Segona Divisió, the second highest football league in Andorra, while the penultimate classified play a two-legged relegation play-off against the runners-up of Segona Divisió. The number of teams of Primera Divisió has changed throughout the league's history:

- 1995–96: 10 clubs
- 1996–97: 12 clubs
- 1997–98: 11 clubs
- 1998–99: 12 clubs
- 1999–00: 7 clubs
- 2000–02: 8 clubs
- 2002–03: 9 clubs
- 2003–23: 8 clubs
- 2023–present: 10 clubs

=== Qualification for European competitions ===
The winner of the league wins a place in the UEFA Champions League qualifications round, while the runners-up of the league and the Cup winner win a place in the UEFA Conference League qualifications round.

== Stadiums ==
Map of the location of the stadiums used in the Primera Divisió.
Primera Divisió is located in Andorra	Primera Divisió is located in Province of Lleida

The Andorran Football Federation organizes the matches of Primera Divisió and Segona Divisió in the stadiums owned by the local federation. Also the federation distributes the stadiums and fields for the training sessions for each team. Since the 2016–17 season, FC Encamp is the only club that has its own stadium (✚), located in Prada de Moles (Camp de Futbol d'Encamp). Until 2016 the Camp d'Esports d'Aixovall hosted former matches of Primera Divisió and Segona Divisió.

Stadium	Location	Capacity
Centre Esportiu d'Alàs	Alàs i Cerc (Spain)	1,500
Estadi Comunal d'Andorra la Vella	Andorra la Vella	1,300
Centre Esportiu d'Ordino	Ordino	200
Andorran Football Federation Training Center	Andorra la Vella	300
Centre d'Entrenament de la Massana	La Massana	300
Camp d'Esports Prada de Moles (✚)	Encamp	550

== Winners ==
Season	Champion	Second place	Third place
1994–95	FC Santa Coloma^{a}	-	-
1995–96	FC Encamp	CE Principat	FC Santa Coloma
1996–97	CE Principat*	FC Andorra Veterans	FC Encamp
1997–98	CE Principat*	FC Santa Coloma	FC Encamp
1998–99	CE Principat*	FC Santa Coloma	FC Encamp
1999–00	Constel·lació Esportiva*	FC Santa Coloma	Inter Escaldes
2000–01	FC Santa Coloma*	UE Sant Julià	Inter Escaldes
2001–02	FC Encamp	UE Sant Julià	FC Santa Coloma
2002–03	FC Santa Coloma*	FC Encamp	UE Sant Julià
2003–04	FC Santa Coloma*	UE Sant Julià	FC Rànger's
2004–05	UE Sant Julià	FC Rànger's	FC Santa Coloma
2005–06	FC Rànger's	UE Sant Julià	FC Santa Coloma
2006–07	FC Rànger's	FC Santa Coloma	UE Sant Julià
2007–08	FC Santa Coloma	UE Sant Julià	FC Rànger's
2008–09	UE Sant Julià	FC Santa Coloma	CE Principat
2009–10	FC Santa Coloma	UE Santa Coloma	UE Sant Julià
2010–11	FC Santa Coloma	UE Sant Julià	FC Lusitanos
2011–12	FC Lusitanos	FC Santa Coloma	UE Santa Coloma
2012–13	FC Lusitanos	FC Santa Coloma	UE Santa Coloma
2013–14	FC Santa Coloma	UE Santa Coloma	UE Sant Julià
2014–15	FC Santa Coloma	FC Lusitanos	UE Santa Coloma
2015–16	FC Santa Coloma	FC Lusitanos	UE Sant Julià
2016–17	FC Santa Coloma	UE Sant Julià	UE Santa Coloma
2017–18	FC Santa Coloma*	UE Engordany	UE Sant Julià
2018–19	FC Santa Coloma	UE Sant Julià	Inter Escaldes
2019–20	Inter Escaldes*	FC Santa Coloma	UE Engordany
2020–21	Inter Escaldes	UE Sant Julià	FC Santa Coloma
2021–22	Inter Escaldes	UE Santa Coloma	UE Sant Julià
2022–23	Atlètic Club d'Escaldes	Inter Escaldes	FC Santa Coloma
2023–24	UE Santa Coloma*	Inter Escaldes	Atlètic Club d'Escaldes
2024–25	Inter Escaldes	Atlètic Club d'Escaldes	FC Santa Coloma
2025–26	Inter Escaldes	UE Santa Coloma	FC Rànger's

*	Team won the double by winning the Copa Constitució the same season.

^{a}: The Andorran Football Federation counts the 1994–95 amateur league title as an official one.

=== Performance by club ===
Club	Winners	Runners-up	Third place	Winning years	Runner-up years	Third place Years
**FC Santa Coloma**^{c}	**13**	8	7	1995, 2001, 2003, 2004, 2008, 2010, 2011, 2014, 2015, 2016, 2017, 2018, 2019	1998, 1999, 2000, 2007, 2009, 2012, 2013, 2020	1996, 2002, 2005, 2006, 2021, 2023, 2025
**Inter d'Escaldes**	**5**	2	3	2020, 2021, 2022, 2025, 2026	2023, 2024	2000, 2001, 2019
CE Principat	**3**	1	1	1997, 1998, 1999	1996	2009
UE Sant Julià	**2**	9	7	2005, 2009	2001, 2002, 2004, 2006, 2008, 2011, 2017, 2019, 2021	2003, 2007, 2010, 2014, 2016, 2018, 2022
FC Lusitanos^{b}	**2**	2	1	2012, 2013	2015, 2016	2011
FC Encamp	**2**	1	3	1996, 2002	2003	1997, 1998, 1999
FC Rànger's	**2**	1	3	2006, 2007	2005	2004, 2008, 2026
**UE Santa Coloma**	**1**	4	4	2024	2010, 2014, 2022, 2026	2012, 2013, 2015, 2017
**Atlètic Club d'Escaldes**	**1**	1	1	2023	2025	2024
Constel·lació Esportiva^{b}	**1**	0	0	2000	–	–
UE Engordany	0	1	1	–	2018	2020
FC Andorra Veterans^{a}	0	1	0	–	1997	–

Bold: indicates clubs currently playing in the top division.
^{a}: Club currently out of competition.
^{b}: Club dissolved.
^{c}: Founder members that have never been relegated from Primera Divisió.

=== Performance by parish ===
Parish	Winners	Runners-up	Third place	Winning clubs
**Andorra la Vella**	**22**	16	14	FC Santa Coloma (13), CE Principat (3), FC Rànger's (2), FC Lusitanos (2), Constel·lació Esportiva (1), UE Santa Coloma (1)
**Escaldes-Engordany**	**4**	3	5	Inter d'Escaldes (3), Atlètic d'Escaldes (1)
**Sant Julià de Lòria**	**2**	9	7	UE Sant Julià (2)
**Encamp**	**2**	1	3	FC Encamp (2)

== All-time Primera Divisió table ==
The All-time Primera Divisió table is an overall record of all match results, points, and goals of every team that has played since its inception in 1995. The table is accurate as of the end of the 2020–21 season. Teams in bold are part of the 2022–23 Primera Divisió. Play-offs games are not included.

Pos	Team	S	GP	W	D	L	GF	GA	Pts	1st	2nd	3rd	4th	5th	T	Debut	Since/Last App	Best
1	**FC Santa Coloma**	28	596	368	171	87	1507	490	**1265**	12	8	6	1	1	28	1995–96	1995–96	1
2	**Sant Julià**	28	596	305	123	168	1359	771	**1034**	2	9	7	4	1	22	1995–96	1995–96	1
3	**Inter d'Escaldes**	26	549	211	89	249	852	1010	**722**	3	1	3	3	3	12	1995–96	2014–15	1
4	Lusitanos	19	404	178	71	154	779	610	**605**	2	2	1	8	3	16	2000–01	2018–19	1
5	**UE Santa Coloma**	15	340	165	77	98	687	393	**572**	–	3	4	3	3	12	2008–09	2008–09	2
6	Principat	19	376	169	53	154	852	695	**560**	3	1	1	2	6	13	1995–96	2013–14	1
7	Encamp	20	417	153	70	194	751	817	**529**	2	1	3	2	–	8	1995–96	2018–19	1
8	**Engordany**	15	340	106	61	173	466	807	**380**	–	1	1	1	2	5	2003–04	2014–15	2
9	Rànger's	9	182	89	22	71	397	383	**289**	2	1	2	1	–	6	2001–02	2011–12	1
10	**Atlètic d'Escaldes**	7	159	61	36	62	231	233	**219**	1	–	–	2	–	3	2004–05	2019–20	1
11	**Ordino**	8	193	59	33	101	266	370	**210**	–	–	–	–	3	3	2013–14	2021–22	5
12	Sporting d'Escaldes	8	150	37	27	86	227	449	**138**	–	–	–	–	1	1	1995–96	2002–03	5
13	La Massana	5	102	24	33	55	126	249	**95**	–	–	–	–	1	1	1995–96	2000–01	5
14	Constel·lació	2	34	23	2	9	122	41	**71**	1	–	–	–	1	2	1998–99	1999–00	1
15	FC Andorra Veterans	2	42	22	5	15	104	95	**71**	–	1	–	–	–	1	1996–97	1997–98	2
16	Aldosa	2	40	19	4	17	70	66	**61**	–	–	–	1	1	2	1995–96	1996–97	4
17	**Penya Encarnada**	4	95	12	15	68	69	304	**61**	–	–	–	–	1	1	2015–16	2020–21	5
18	Benito	2	42	16	6	20	63	81	**54**	–	–	–	–	–	–	1997–98	1998–99	7
19	Carroi	3	71	11	9	51	56	98	**42**	–	–	–	–	–	–	2019–20	2019–20	7
20	Engolasters	2	42	11	8	23	54	74	**41**	–	–	–	–	–	–	1997–98	1998–99	6
21	Gimnàstic Valira	3	64	7	6	51	81	264	**27**	–	–	–	–	–	–	1996–97	1998–99	6
22	Extremenya	3	64	7	3	54	55	266	**24**	–	–	–	–	–	–	1998–99	2005–06	8
23	Les Bons	1	22	6	4	12	37	66	**22**	–	–	–	–	–	–	1996–97	1996–97	10
24	CE Benfica	2	40	3	4	33	28	165	**13**	–	–	–	–	–	–	2007–08	2010–11	8
25	Spordany Juvenil	2	40	4	0	16	48	238	**12**	–	–	–	–	–	–	1995–96	1996–97	9
26	Construccions Emprimo	1	18	1	1	16	18	78	**4**	–	–	–	–	–	–	1995–96	1995–96	10
27	Jenlai	1	27	2	1	24	18	137	**4** (Note: Three points docked)	–	–	–	–	–	–	2016–17	2016–17	8

League or status at 2020–21 season:

2020–21 Primera Divisió
2020–21 Segona Divisió
Clubs that no longer exist or are not competing

== Top scorers ==
Year	Best scorers	Team	Goals
1995–96	-	-	-
1996–97	(Andorra) Patricio González	CE Principat	25
1997–98	(Spain) Rafael Sánchez	FC Santa Coloma	36
1998–99	-	-	-
1999–00	-	-	-
2000–01	-	-	-
2001–02	-	-	-
2002–03	-	-	-
2003–04	(Portugal) Jorge Filipe Sa Silva	UE Sant Julià	16
2004–05	-	-	-
2005–06	-	-	-
2006–07	(Argentina) Norberto Urbani	FC Rànger's	14
2006–07	(Andorra) Joan Toscano	FC Santa Coloma	14
2007–08	-	-	-
2008–09	(Argentina) Norberto Urbani	FC Rànger's	22
2009–10	(Andorra) Gabi Riera	UE Sant Julià	19
2010–11	(Spain) Victor Bernat	UE Santa Coloma	16
2011–12	(Spain) Victor Bernat	UE Santa Coloma	14
2012–13	(Portugal) Bruninho	FC Lusitanos	17
2013–14	(Portugal) Luis Miguel dos Reis	FC Lusitanos	13
2014–15	(Andorra) Cristian Martínez	FC Santa Coloma	22
2015–16	(Spain) Victor Bernat	UE Santa Coloma	12
2016–17	(Spain) Victor Bernat	UE Santa Coloma	18
2017–18	(Spain) Chus Sosa	FC Santa Coloma	14
2018–19	(Chile) Nico Medina	FC Lusitanos	10
2019–20	(Spain) Genís Soldevila	Inter Club d'Escaldes	16
2020–21	(France) Guillaume Lopez	Engordany	11
2021–22	(Chile) Jaime Grondona (France) Guillaume Lopez	FC Santa Coloma FC Santa Coloma	14
2023–24	(Spain) Faysal Chouaib	UE Santa Coloma	19
