= Aixovall =

Village in Sant Julià de Lòria, Andorra

- Location in Andorra
- Coordinates: 42°28′34.89″N 1°29′22.17″E
- Country: Andorra
- Parish: Sant Julià de Lòria
- Elevation: 1,044 m (3,425 ft)

Population (2023)
  - Total: 80

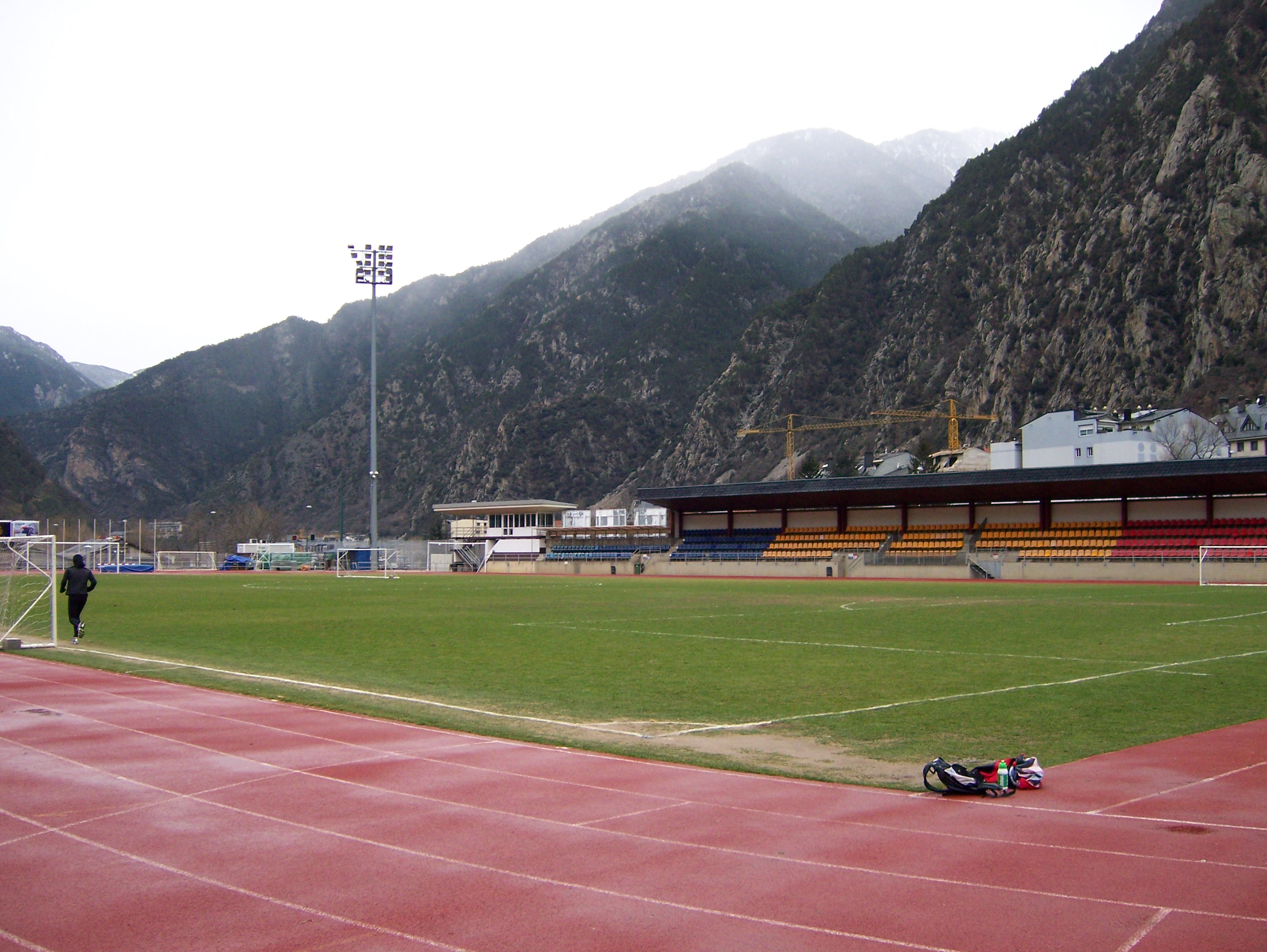

Aixovall (Catalan pronunciation: [ajʃoˈβaʎ]) is a village in Andorra, and one of the country's 44 official poblacions. It is located in the parish of Sant Julià de Lòria.

== Geography ==
The village is located in the south-west of the country, near the border with Spain. It lies on the intersection of the CG-1 and CG-6 main roads, both of which run through the village.

== Sport ==
The village is home to Andorra's national football stadium, the Camp d’Esports d’Aixovall. It also contains the national vehicle safety testing centre (ITV) where every vehicle over five years old is taken annually for safety tests.
