= FC Lusitanos =

Association football club in Andorra

Lusitanos
- Full name: Futbol Club Lusitanos Andorra
- Nicknames: LFC; Lusitanos (Lusitanians); Lusos
- Founded: 1999; 27 years ago
- Dissolved: 2020; 6 years ago
- Ground: Andorra Football Federation stadiums
- Chairman: António da Silva Cerqueira
- Manager: Joaquim Ferreira
- League: Segona Divisió
- 2019–20: 5th
- Website: www.fclusitans.com
Home colours	Away colours	Third colours

FC Lusitanos, also known as Lusitans, was an Andorran football club from Andorra la Vella which was founded in 1999 and dissolved in 2020.

Lusitanos won their first Primera Divisió title in 2011–12 and its second national championship the following season. The club's name, crest and kit reflect its Portuguese identity.

The club's final season was the 2019–2020 season in the Segona Divisió.

== History ==
Futbol Club Lusitanos (Futbol Club Lusitans, Portuguese: Futebol Clube Lusitanos) was founded in 1999. The club played for the first time in the Campionat de Lliga in 2000–01, after winning the Second Division championship. In 2001–02 they won its first title, the Copa Constitució after winning 2–0 in the final against Inter Club d'Escaldes on 2 June, with both goals by Manuel Vieira.

Lusitanos played their first European matches in the 2010–11 UEFA Europa League, where they were eliminated 11–0 on aggregate by Macedonian club Rabotnicki. In the following season's tournament, they were beaten at the same stage by Croatian club Varaždin, 6–1 on aggregate.

Since their promotion to the top division they have not been relegated, and won their first title in 2011–12. This qualified the club to the 2012–13 UEFA Champions League, where they were knocked out 9–1 on aggregate in the first qualifying round by Maltese champions Valletta.

They won their second league title in 2013, this qualified the club to the 2013–14 UEFA Champions League they were drawn to play EB/Streymur of the Faroe Islands, in the first leg they drew 2–2 and in the second leg they lost 5–1, losing 7–3 on aggregate.

After finishing fourth in the regular season FC Lusitanos ended the 2013–14 season without being qualified for the UEFA Europa League after losing against Sant Julià 1–2 in the final of the 2014 Copa Constitució.

In the 2014–15 season FC Lusitanos became runners-up of the regular league, which qualified the club to the 2015–16 UEFA Europa League. They were drawn to face West Ham United in the first qualifying round, where they lost 0–3 in the away match and 0–1 at home (0–4 on aggregate).

== Identity and support ==
FC Lusitanos' logo greatly resembles that of the Portuguese Football Federation. Since its founding, the club has had several Portuguese players and coaches. The supporters, known as Lusitanos or Lusos, are mainly Portuguese immigrants in Andorra or Andorran people of Portuguese heritage.

The team's kit manufacturer is the Portuguese brand Peba.

Original first kit.

Period *	Kitmaker	Kit sponsor
1999–12	Peba	La Posa
2012–15	Peba	None
2015–present	Peba/Armatura	Les Barques

* Since the Andorra Football Federation affiliation.

== Honours ==
- Primera Divisió:
  - Winners (2): 2011–12, 2012–13
  - Runners-up (2): 2014–15, 2015–16
- Copa Constitució:
  - Winners (1): 2002
  - Runners-up (3): 2008, 2009, 2012, 2014
- Supercopa Andorrana:
  - Winners (2): 2012, 2013
- Segona Divisió:
  - Winners (1): 1999–00

== League history ==
Season		Pos.	Pl.	W	D	L	GS	GA	P
2000–01	Primera Divisió	5	20	7	5	8	35	42	26
2001–02	Primera Divisió	5	20	6	4	10	32	39	22
2002–03	Primera Divisió	5	22	12	1	9	63	40	37
2003–04	Primera Divisió	6	20	5	6	9	24	29	21
2004–05	Primera Divisió	6	20	5	2	13	24	48	17
2005–06	Primera Divisió	4	20	9	1	10	30	41	28
2006–07	Primera Divisió	4	20	6	3	11	22	41	21
2007–08	Primera Divisió	4	20	10	1	9	44	29	31
2008–09	Primera Divisió	4	20	10	0	10	39	30	30
2009–10	Primera Divisió	4	20	7	3	10	34	32	24
2010–11	Primera Divisió	3	20	11	5	4	43	20	38
2011–12	Primera Divisió	1	20	11	7	2	48	18	40
2012–13	Primera Divisió	1	20	13	5	2	64	16	44
2013–14	Primera Divisió	4	20	11	2	7	57	20	35
2014–15	Primera Divisió	2	20	12	3	5	53	26	39
2015–16	Primera Divisió	2	20	12	3	5	37	28	39
2016–17	Primera Divisió	4	27	13	9	5	49	30	48
2017–18	Primera Divisió	4	27	13	5	9	59	35	44
2018–19	Primera Divisió	7	27	5	6	16	22	46	21
2019-20	Segona Divisió	5	15	7	2	6	48	22	20[R]

[R] Three points deducted. Season abandoned due to the COVID-19 pandemic.

== European results ==
Season	Competition	Round	Club	Home	Away	Agg.
2010–11	2010–11 UEFA Europa League	1QR	(North Macedonia) Rabotnichki	0–6	0-5	0–11
2011–12	2011–12 UEFA Europa League	1QR	(Croatia) Varaždin	0–1	1-5	1–6
2012–13	2012–13 UEFA Champions League	1QR	(Malta) Valletta	0–1	0-8	0–9
2013–14	2013–14 UEFA Champions League	1QR	(Faroe Islands) EB/Streymur	2–2	1-5	3–7
2015–16	2015–16 UEFA Europa League	1QR	(England) West Ham United	0–1	0-3	0–4
2016–17	2016–17 UEFA Europa League	1QR	(Slovenia) Domžale	1-2	1–3	2–5

== European record ==
Competition	Matches	W	D	L	GF	GA
UEFA Champions League	4	0	1	3	3	16
UEFA Europa League	8	0	0	8	3	26
Total	12	0	1	11	6	42

== Current squad ==
As of 3 March 2019

Note: Flags indicate national team as defined under FIFA eligibility rules; some limited exceptions apply. Players may hold more than one non-FIFA nationality.

No.	Pos.	Nation	Player
1	GK	AND	Alberto Usubiaga
2	DF	ARG	Matías Vaamonde
3	DF	PER	Ismael Canta
4	DF	AND	Adri Rodrígues
5	MF	FRA	Jean Mavinga
6	MF	AND	Iván García
7	DF	USA	Mark Withers
8	DF	TUN	Sofiane Dridi
9	FW	BRA	Jefferson Martins
10	FW	POR	Luís dos Reis (Captain)
12	GK	BRA	Marcelo Valverde

No.	Pos.	Nation	Player
14	FW	PER	Héctor Urrunaga
15	MF	AND	David Cortez
16	FW	AND	David Astor
17	FW	ESP	Sergio Urbano
20	FW	ITA	Maurizio Falzone
21	MF	POR	Hugo Costa
22	MF	AND	Daniel Mejías
24	FW	GHA	Rashid Idris
—	MF	AND	Alex Barreiro
—	MF	AND	Nicolás Quiroz
—	MF	POR	Pedro Fernandes
