= UE Extremenya =

Association football club in Andorra

- Full name: Unió Esportiva Extremenya Comercial Aris
- Founded: 1998; 28 years ago
- Ground: Andorra Football Federation stadiums
- Chairman: Albert Jansá
- Manager: José Izquierdo Alarcón
- League: Segona Divisió
- 2021–22: Segona Divisió, 3rd
Home colours	Away colours

UE Extremenya is an Andorran football club based in the parish of La Massana. The club currently plays in Segona Divisió.

== History ==
The club was founded in 1998 as CE Cerni. The club played the 1998–99 Campionat de Lliga, being relegated to the Segona Divisió at the end of the season. They stayed in the Second Division until the coming back in the top flight during the 2002–03 season. The club was relegated after finishing 8th at the end of the regular season.

The club suffered another relegation to the Second Division for the 2005–06 season after one year in the top division. The 2005–06 season in the Andorran Premier League was a catastrophe with only one point in 20 games (1–1 at home against CE Principat on 12 February 2006).

The following season they finished 5th in the Second Division of Andorra. The club has never stayed for two consecutive years in the Andorran Premier League, being participated in the top flight during three different seasons (1999–00, 2003–04 and 2006–07).

UE Extremenya played the playoffs for one spot in Primera Divisió after finishing third in the Second Division of Andorra during the 2009–10 season (promotion-ineligible Lusitanos B finished second). Facing FC Encamp after two games UE Extremenya lost in the aggregate of 2–5. Two years after during the 2011–12 season, UE Extremenya finished second in the Segona Divisió, competed in a two-legged playoff against Inter Club d'Escaldes for being in the Premier Andorran League the following season. The team lost in the aggregate of 0–3.

== Colors and badge ==
The club colors representing the club are traditionally black, white and green as the Spanish autonomous community of Extremadura. The flag of Extremadura is featured in the kit.

Former crest for CE Cerni and FC Cerni, used until 2003.

Alternative crest of UE Extremenya.

Flag of Extremadura featured in the kit.

== Name history ==
- 1998: The club was founded as CE Cerni
- 2002: The club changed his name to FC Cerni
- 2003: The club changed his name to UE Extremenya

== Primera Divisió history ==
Season		Pos.	Pl.	W	D	L	GS	GA	P
1998–99	Campionat de Lliga	9	22	5	1	16	23	83	16
2002–03	Campionat de Lliga	8	22	2	1	19	21	85	7
2005–06	Campionat de Lliga	8	22	-	1	21	11	98	1
