= Santa Coloma d'Andorra =

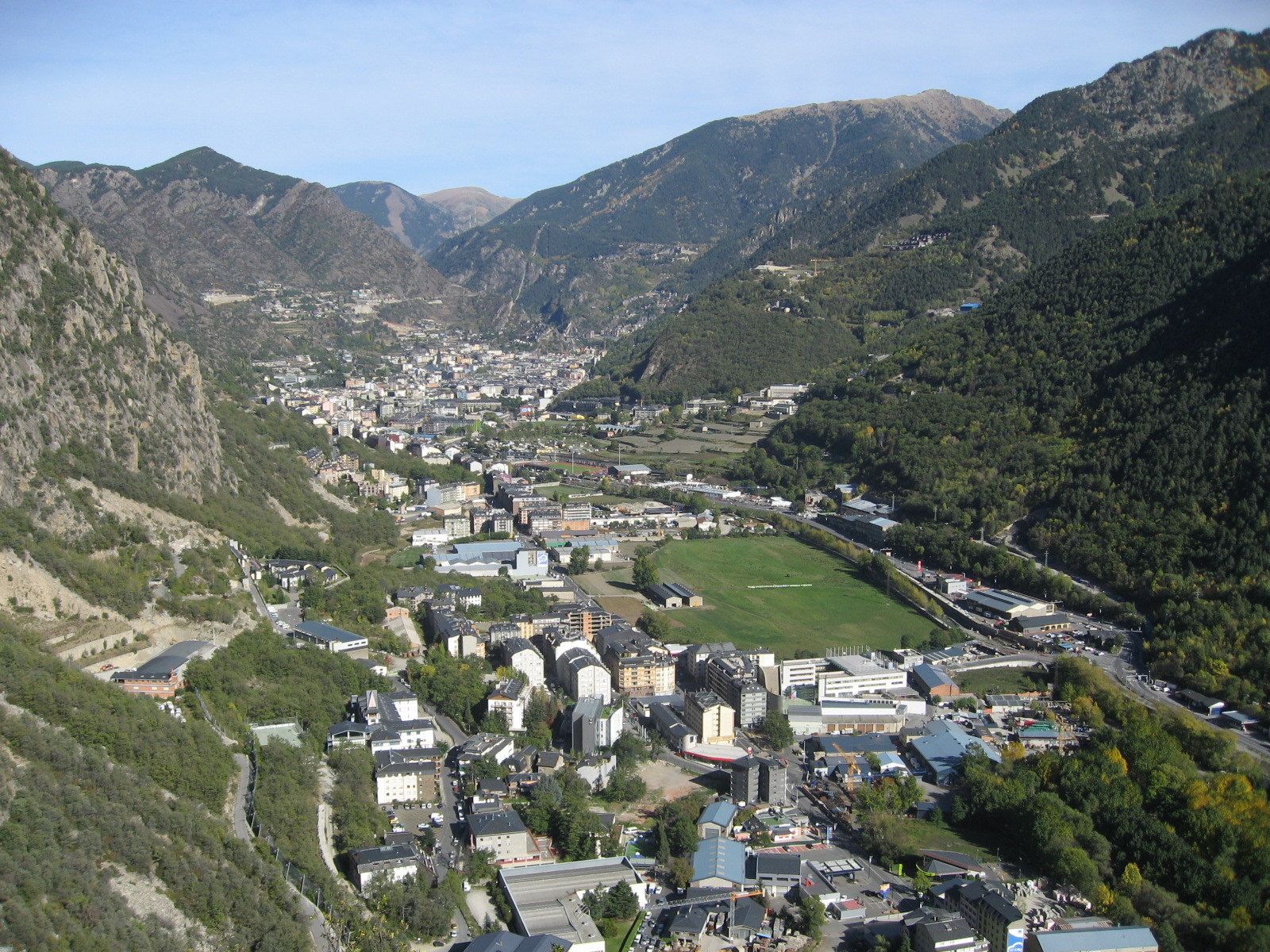
- Santa Coloma and the Gran Valira river (right) as seen from a nearby mountain

- Location in Andorra
- Coordinates: 42°29′38.03″N 1°29′51.66″E
- Country: Andorra
- Parish: Andorra la Vella
- Elevation: 1,134 m (3,720 ft)

Population (2012)
  - Total: 3,040
- Time zone: UTC+01:00 (CET)
  - Summer (DST): UTC+02:00 (CEST)

Santa Coloma d'Andorra (Catalan pronunciation: [ˈsanta koˈloma ðanˈdɔra]), also known as Santa Coloma, is an Andorran town in the parish of Andorra la Vella, located near the Gran Valira river and 2 km away from the capital, Andorra la Vella.

== Geography ==
To its west are the mountain villages of Aixàs and Bixessarri in Andorra, and Os de Civís in Spain.

== Notable buildings ==
It houses a historic church that was nominated as a UNESCO World Heritage site on 22 February 1999 in the Cultural category.

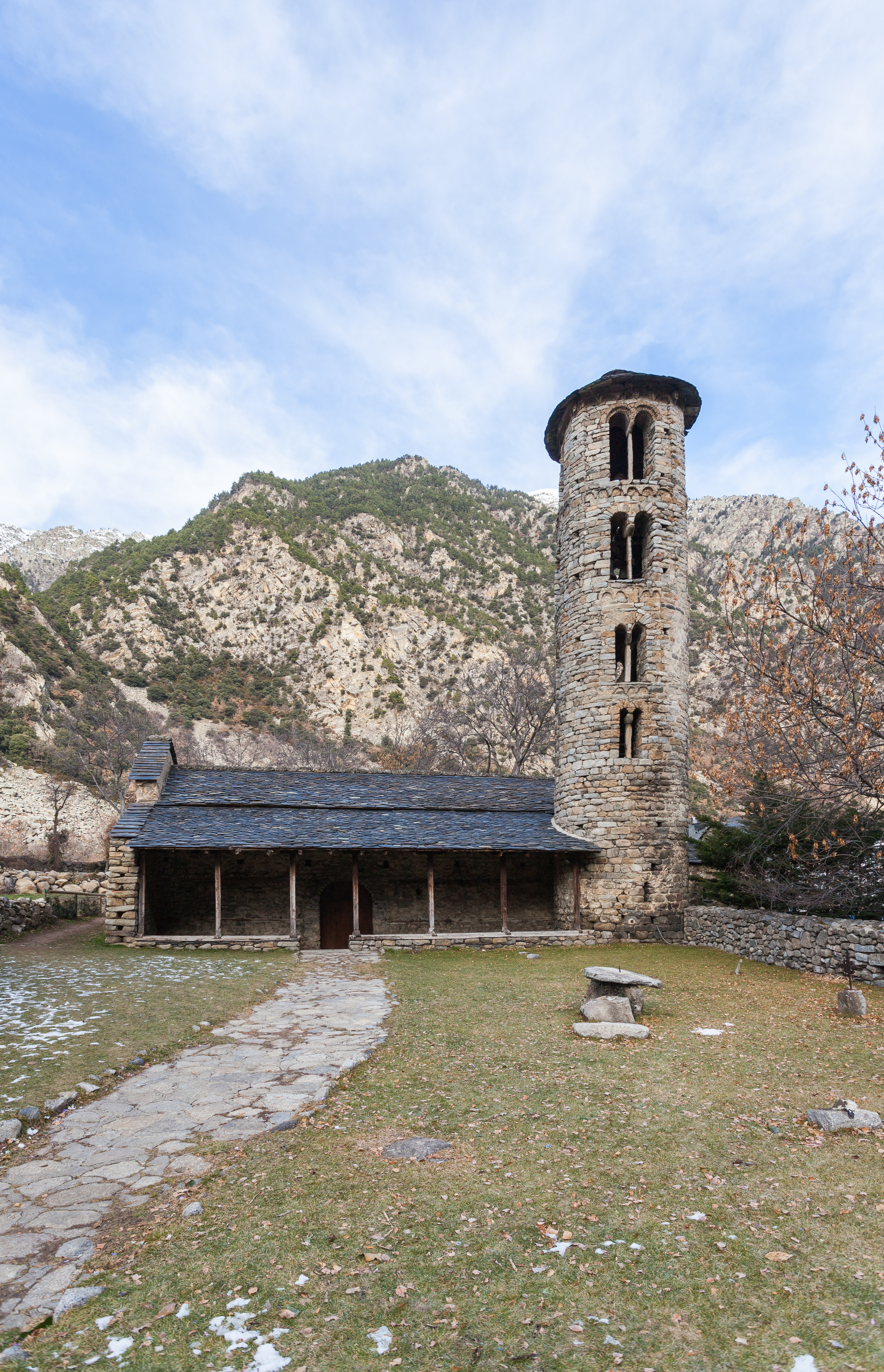
The exterior of the Church of Santa Coloma d'Andorra

== See also ==
- La Margineda
