= UE Engordany =

Association football club in Andorra

Engordany
- Full name: Unió Esportiva Engordany
- Nickname(s): Guerrers (Warriors); Fidels (The Loyals)
- Founded: 1980; 45 years ago
- Ground: Andorra Football Federation stadiums
- Chairman: Jacques Lafont
- Manager: Jesús Barón
- League: Segona Divisió
- Website: https://engordany.news/

Unió Esportiva Engordany is an Andorran multi-sports club based in Escaldes-Engordany. The club football section plays in Primera Divisió.

== History ==
Club's crest until 2017.

The club was founded on 2 October 1980 as Unió Esportiva Engordany Futbol Club in the main venue of Engordany by Manuel Puerta Martín, Manuel Varela Valés and Josep Rodríguez Sànchez. On 28 January 1981 the club was established and was later renamed simply as UE Engordany. In 2001 the club was affiliated in the FAF and began competing in the Segona Divisió, being promoted to Primera Divisió in 2003. However the club was relegated the following year after one season playing in the Andorran top league.

In the 2006–07 season they finished 3rd in the Andorran 2nd division. Because FC Santa Coloma's B Team, who finished 2nd, was not eligible for the 1st division, they went into play-offs against 7th from the 1st division, Encamp. By winning 2–1 at home (goals by Rubén and Joan Marc) and drawing 3–3 in the away game, they were promoted to the premier Andorran league for the 2007–08 season.

The club finished 7th facing the relegation play-offs against UE Extremenya. After losing 2–3 at home the away game was won 3–0. Thereby the club remains in the premier Andorran league for the 2008–09 season. Although in the 2012–13 season UE Engordany suffer the relegation to the 2nd division after finishing 8th in the regular season. The club returned to the top flight after finishing 1st in the 2013–14 season of the 2nd division.

During 2015 and 2016 the club had an agreement and collaboration with the Spanish Football Academy Alwaysoccer Barcelona for the sports development and training of both entities. At the end of the season the club achieved the Copa Constitució final for the first time in their history after defeating two biggest clubs of Andorra as Lusitans and Sant Julià but lost 3–0 against UE Santa Coloma. In 2018 the club achieved the 2nd position in the regular league season being able to compete the 2018–19 UEFA Europa League.

UE Engordany maintains a healthy rivalry with Inter Club d'Escaldes being the two clubs of Escaldes-Engordany that have played more seasons in Primera Divisió.

== Honours ==
=== Football ===
- Primera Divisió:
  - Runners-up (1): 2017–18
- Copa Constitució:
  - Winners (1): 2019
  - Runners-up (1): 2016
- Segona Divisió:
  - Winners (2): 2002–03, 2013–14

=== Basketball ===
- Lliga Andorrana de Bàsquet:
  - Winners (4): 2010–11, 2011–12, 2013–14, 2014–15
- Copa LAB:
  - Winners (1): 2012
