= Camp d'Esports d'Aixovall =

Football stadium in Aixovall, Andorra

Coordinates: 42°28′35″N 1°29′16″E

Camp d’Esports d’Aixovall
- Interactive map of Camp d’Esports d’Aixovall
- Full name: Camp d’Esports d’Aixovall
- Location: Aixovall, Sant Julià de Lòria, Andorra
- Capacity: 1000
- Surface: Artificial turf

Construction
- Built: 1999
- Expanded: 90x65
- Demolished: 2016

Tenant
- Andorra National Football Team

The Camp d’Esports d’Aixovall, officially named DEVK-Arena due to a sponsorship arrangement, is a former football stadium in Aixovall, in the parish Sant Julià de Lòria, near the capital, Andorra la Vella, in Andorra. The stadium had a capacity of 1,000 spectators, all seated.

The Camp d’Esports d’Aixovall and the Estadi Comunal d'Andorra la Vella together hosted all of the games of Andorra's two highest football competitions, the Lliga de Primera Divisió and the Lliga de Segona Divisió.
