= FC Rànger's =

Association football club in Andorra

Rànger's
- Full name: Rànger's FC Andorra
- Nickname: The Rànger's
- Founded: 1981; 45 years ago
- Ground: Andorra Football Federation stadiums
- Chairman: Marco Fabián
- Coach: Jaime Durán
- League: Primera Divisió
- 2025-26: Primera Divisió, 3rd of 10
- Website: www.rangersfc.ad
Home colours	Away colours

Rànger's FC Andorra is an Andorran professional football club based in Andorra la Vella. The team currently plays in the Primera Divisió.

== History ==
The club was founded in 1981, but they only started playing in Andorran leagues in 1999. Despite the similarity of its name, FC Rànger's are not associated with the Scottish team Rangers. After two years in the Andorran Second Division, they played for the first time in the Campionat de Lliga in the 2001–02 season. After promotion, FC Rànger's finished second in 2005, then won the league title the two subsequent years, 2006 and 2007.

Rànger's F.C. Andorra made their first appearance in European competitions, playing the UEFA Intertoto Cup in the summer of 2005, being eliminated by Sturm Graz by 6–1 in aggregate. The home match ended with a 1–1 draw, scored by Norberto Urbani. After winning the Andorran championship, they qualified for the UEFA Cup, where they were eliminated in the first round by FK Sarajevo. Rànger's F.C. Andorra became the first Andorran team to compete in the UEFA Champions League by qualifying for the 2007–08 season. However, their stay was short-lived as they were eliminated in the first qualifying round after a 5–0 aggregate loss to Sheriff Tiraspol over two rounds played on 18 July and 24 July 2007.

At the end of the 2008–09 season the team was relegated. After two seasons in Segona Divisió the team finished second in the 2010–11 season and was promoted (promotion-ineligible Lusitanos B finished champion). In the 2011–12 season Rànger's F.C. Andorra finished 8th in Primera Divisió being relegated again to Segona Divisió, where it remained until promotion back to the Primera Divisió for the 2024–25 season.

- Sponsorship:
  - Pizzeria Venècia (2004–2006)
  - Construccions Buiques (2006–2009)
  - Assega Insurance (2022–Present)

== Honours ==
- Primera Divisió:
  - Winners (2): 2005–06, 2006–07
  - Runners-up (1): 2004–05
- Copa Constitució:
  - Runners-up (1): 2006
- Supercopa Andorrana:
  - Winners (1): 2006
  - Runners-up (1): 2007
- Segona Divisió:
  - Winners (1): 2000–01
  - Runners-up (2): 2010–11, 2023–24

== Current squad ==
As of April 6, 2026 Note: Flags indicate national team as defined under FIFA eligibility rules; some limited exceptions apply. Players may hold more than one non-FIFA nationality.

No.	Pos.	Nation	Player
1	GK	MEX	Raúl Gudiño
3	DF	MEX	Sergio Villarreal
4	MF	AND	Marc Rebés
5	MF	MEX	Marco Fabián
6	MF	AND	Gerard Estrada
7	DF	MEX	Julio Nava
8	FW	MEX	Leonel Prieto
12	MF	MEX	Emilio Tame
13	GK	ARG	Matías Rubén
14	FW	AND	Iván Domínguez
15	DF	MEX	José Ruiz
16	MF	MEX	Jesús Miranda

No.	Pos.	Nation	Player
17	FW	AND	Gaby Leighton
18	MF	MEX	Benjamín Muñoz
19	FW	ESP	David Segura
20	DF	ESP	Aleix Cisteró
21	FW	ESP	Álex Ginard
22	FW	ESP	Borja Morales
23	MF	MEX	Jesús de Lucio
25	DF	MEX	Francisco Rábago
—	GK	ESP	Iván González
—	DF	ESP	David Crespo
—	MF	MEX	Zahid Muñoz
—	FW	MEX	Arturo Sánchez

== European records ==
As of December, 2008.

Season	Competition	Round	Club	Home	Away	Agg.
2005–06	2005 UEFA Intertoto Cup	1R	(Austria) Sturm Graz	1–1	0–5	1–6
2006–07	2006–07 UEFA Cup	1QR	(Bosnia and Herzegovina) Sarajevo	0–2	0–3	0–5
2007–08	2007–08 UEFA Champions League	1QR	(Moldova) Sheriff Tiraspol	0–3	0–2	0–5
