= CE Principat =

Association football club in Andorra

- Full name: Club Esportiu Principat
- Nicknames: CEP; El Principat; Princi
- Founded: 1989
- Dissolved: 2015
- Ground: Andorra Football Federation stadiums
Home colours	Away colours

Club Esportiu Principat was an Andorran football club created in 1989, based in the city of Andorra la Vella. It was one of the most successful football clubs in Andorra along with FC Santa Coloma and UE Sant Julià, having won three times the Andorran Premier League and five times the Andorran Cup. The club was dissolved in 2015.

== History ==
The club was founded in 1989 by Penya Madridista Restaurant Charlie's (Real Madrid Supporters' Club of Charlie's Restaurant) as Club Esportiu Principat. CE Principat was the main club in Andorra la Vella having achieved the record of three consecutive league victories between 1997 and 1999 and five consecutive cup trophies between 1995 and 1999. Since the creation of the Andorran Premier League in 1995, CE Principat was playing in the top flight until 2014 after finishing 8th in the regular league.

In 1997, the club made history by being the first Andorran club participating in European competition facing the Scottish club Dundee United. The Andorran team has qualified three times for the European Competitions (UEFA Cup) along 1997 and 1999, but has been eliminated in the first round each time, thus being ranked last in the all-time table of all European Cups with 6 losses and 48 conceded goals.

CE Principat were one of the most successful clubs of Andorra until 1999. Since then, the club only reached third in the regular 2008–09 season league and six times Copa Constitució semifinalist during the 2000–01, 2001–02, 2003–04, 2004–05, 2008–09 and 2009–10 seasons.

The senior club was registered in Segona Divisió after suffering relegation during the 2013–14 season but withdrew from the competition in the first round. However, lower and youth teams continued to compete in their respective competitions. In 2015 the club was not registered in any national competition.. In 2025-2026, they registered in the segunda divisio finishing last.

== Colours and badge ==
The team's traditional color was purple. The first and last team's shield was purple, but there was an alternative official logo with the colours of Andorra (blue, yellow and red). From the team's beginning until the mid-2000s, their first kit was white due to the origins of the club linked with Real Madrid supporters in Andorra.

Their second kit has been changed since the creation of the club, alternating between the traditional blue and yellow second kit and the black (2005–2011) and orange (1989–2004) kits.

Alternative badge.

Original first kit.
Away (1989–2004)
Away (2005–2011)

== Honours ==
- Primera Divisió:
  - Winners (3): 1996–97, 1997–98, 1998–99
  - Runners-up (1): 1995–96
- Copa Constitució:
  - Winners (5): 1994–95, 1995–96, 1996–97, 1997–98, 1998–99

== European record ==
As of December, 2008.

Season	Competition	Round	Club	Home	Away	Agg.
1997–98	1997–98 UEFA Cup	1QR	(Scotland) Dundee United	0–8	0–9	0–17
1998–99	1998–99 UEFA Cup	1QR	(Hungary) Ferencváros	1–8	0–6	1–14
1999–2000	1999–2000 UEFA Cup	QR	(Norway) Viking	0-11	0–7	0–18
