= 2011 South American U-20 Championship squads =

The 2011 South American U-20 Championship was an international football tournament held in Peru from 26 January to 6 February 2011. The ten national teams involved in the tournament were required to register a squad of twenty players; only players in these squads were eligible to take part in the tournament.

Each national team had to present a list of players by 6 January 2011. Each player had to have been born after 1 January 1991.

Players' names marked in bold have been capped at full international level.

== Argentina ==
Coach: Wálter Perazzo

No.	Pos.	Player	Date of birth (age)	Caps	Goals	Club
1	GK	**Esteban Andrada**	January 26, 1991 (aged 19)	0	0	(Argentine Football Association) Lanús
2	DF	**Germán Pezzella**	June 27, 1991 (aged 19)	0	0	(Argentine Football Association) River Plate
3	DF	**Nicolás Tagliafico**	August 31, 1992 (aged 18)			(Argentine Football Association) Banfield
4	DF	Hugo Nervo	January 6, 1991 (aged 20)			(Argentine Football Association) Arsenal
5	MF	Bruno Zuculini	April 2, 1993 (aged 17)			(Argentine Football Association) Racing Club
6	DF	Leonel Galeano	August 2, 1991 (aged 19)			(Argentine Football Association) Independiente
7	FW	Juan Iturbe	June 4, 1993 (aged 17)	0	0	(Argentine Football Association) Quilmes
8	MF	Ezequiel Cirigliano	January 20, 1992 (aged 18)			(Argentine Football Association) River Plate
9	FW	**Rogelio Funes Mori**	March 5, 1991 (aged 19)	0	0	(Argentine Football Association) River Plate
10	MF	Michael Hoyos	August 2, 1991 (aged 19)			(Argentine Football Association) Estudiantes
11	FW	Sergio Araujo	January 28, 1992 (aged 18)			(Argentine Football Association) Boca Juniors
12	GK	Rodrigo Rey	March 8, 1991 (aged 19)			(Argentine Football Association) River Plate
13	DF	Leandro González Pirez	February 26, 1992 (aged 18)			(Argentine Football Association) River Plate
14	MF	Claudio Mosca	April 9, 1991 (aged 19)			(Argentine Football Association) Arsenal
15	DF	Adrián Martínez	February 13, 1992 (aged 18)			(Argentine Football Association) San Lorenzo
16	MF	**Rodrigo Battaglia**	July 12, 1991 (aged 19)			(Argentine Football Association) Huracán
17	MF	Héctor Cardozo	August 5, 1991 (aged 19)			(Argentine Football Association) Estudiantes
18	DF	Lucas Rodríguez	September 27, 1993 (aged 17)			(Argentine Football Association) Argentinos Juniors
19	FW	Facundo Ferreyra	March 14, 1991 (aged 19)			(Argentine Football Association) Banfield
20	MF	Mauro Díaz	March 10, 1991 (aged 19)			(Argentine Football Association) River Plate

(Source for player names:)

== Bolivia ==
Coach: Marco Sandy

No.	Pos.	Player	Date of birth (age)	Caps	Goals	Club
1	GK	Pedro Lusquiño	May 25, 1992 (aged 18)			(Bolivian Football Federation) Callejas
2	DF	Rodrigo Borda	February 11, 1992 (aged 18)			(Bolivian Football Federation) Aurora
3	DF	Jorge Cuéllar	April 29, 1991 (aged 19)			(Bolivian Football Federation) Callejas
4	DF	Leandro Gareca	June 23, 1991 (aged 19)			(Bolivian Football Federation) Universitario de Sucre
5	DF	Jorge Toco	January 13, 1992 (aged 19)			(Bolivian Football Federation) Oriente Petrolero
6	DF	**Rony Montero**	May 15, 1991 (aged 19)			(Bolivian Football Federation) Oriente Petrolero
7	DF	**Daniel Ballivián**	April 8, 1992 (aged 18)			(Bolivian Football Federation) Universitario de Sucre
8	MF	**Alejandro Chumacero**	April 22, 1991 (aged 19)			(Bolivian Football Federation) The Strongest
9	FW	Landívar Reyes	August 18, 1991 (aged 19)			(Argentine Football Association) Rosario Central
10	MF	Gianakis Suárez	September 16, 1991 (aged 19)			(Bolivian Football Federation) Wilstermann
11	FW	Jorge Becerra	May 16, 1991 (aged 19)			(Bolivian Football Federation) Jorge Wilstermann
12	GK	Luis Cárdenas	December 6, 1991 (aged 19)			(Bolivian Football Federation) Blooming
13	MF	Miguel Quiroga	September 15, 1991 (aged 19)			(Bolivian Football Federation) The Strongest
14	MF	Henry Torrico	January 23, 1991 (aged 19)			(Bolivian Football Federation) Blooming
15	DF	Sergio Garzón	February 16, 1991 (aged 19)			(Bolivian Football Federation) Jorge Wilstermann
16	DF	Alejandro Méndez	January 11, 1992 (aged 19)			(Bolivian Football Federation) Bolívar
17	MF	Óscar Sanz	February 1, 1991 (aged 19)			(Bolivian Football Federation) Universitario de Sucre
18	FW	**Darwin Ríos**	April 25, 1991 (aged 19)			(Bolivian Football Federation) Guabirá
19	MF	Josué Hoyos	September 29, 1992 (aged 18)			(Bolivian Football Federation) Universidad Santa Cruz
20	MF	Jhon Carinao	September 13, 1991 (aged 19)			(Bolivian Football Federation) Bolívar

== Brazil ==
Coach: Ney Franco

No.	Pos.	Player	Date of birth (age)	Caps	Goals	Club
1	GK	**Gabriel**	September 27, 1992 (aged 18)			(Brazilian Football Confederation) Cruzeiro
2	DF	**Danilo**	July 15, 1991 (aged 19)			(Brazilian Football Confederation) Santos
3	DF	**Bruno Uvini**	June 3, 1991 (aged 19)			(Brazilian Football Confederation) São Paulo
4	DF	**Juan Jesus**	June 10, 1991 (aged 19)			(Brazilian Football Confederation) Internacional
5	MF	**Casemiro**	February 23, 1992 (aged 18)	0	0	(Brazilian Football Confederation) São Paulo
6	DF	**Alex Sandro**	January 26, 1991 (aged 19)	0	0	(Brazilian Football Confederation) Santos
7	FW	**Neymar**	February 5, 1992 (aged 18)	2	1	(Brazilian Football Confederation) Santos
8	MF	Zé Eduardo	August 16, 1991 (aged 19)			(Italian Football Federation) Parma
9	FW	Henrique Almeida	May 27, 1991 (aged 19)			(Brazilian Football Confederation) São Paulo
10	MF	**Lucas Moura**	August 13, 1992 (aged 18)	0	0	(Brazilian Football Confederation) São Paulo
11	MF	**Oscar**	September 9, 1991 (aged 19)	0	0	(Brazilian Football Confederation) Internacional
12	GK	Aleks	February 20, 1991 (aged 19)			(Brazilian Football Confederation) Avaí
13	DF	Rafael Galhardo	October 30, 1991 (aged 19)			(Brazilian Football Confederation) Flamengo
14	DF	Romário	June 28, 1992 (aged 18)			(Brazilian Football Confederation) Internacional
15	DF	Gabriel Silva	May 13, 1991 (aged 19)			(Brazilian Football Confederation) Palmeiras
16	MF	**Fernando**	March 3, 1992 (aged 18)			(Brazilian Football Confederation) Grêmio
17	MF	Alan Patrick	February 13, 1991 (aged 19)			(Brazilian Football Confederation) Santos
18	FW	Diego Maurício	June 25, 1991 (aged 19)			(Brazilian Football Confederation) Flamengo
19	DF	Saimon	March 3, 1991 (aged 19)			(Brazilian Football Confederation) Grêmio
20	FW	Willian José	November 23, 1991 (aged 19)			(Brazilian Football Confederation) Grêmio Prudente

== Chile ==
Coach: César Vaccia

No.	Pos.	Player	Date of birth (age)	Caps	Goals	Club
1	GK	Claudio Santis	October 12, 1992 (aged 18)	0	0	(Football Federation of Chile) Universidad Católica
2	DF	Cristian Magaña	February 26, 1991 (aged 19)	0	0	(Football Federation of Chile) Colo-Colo
3	DF	Pedro Salgado	November 6, 1992 (aged 18)	0	0	(Football Federation of Chile) Universidad Católica
4	DF	**José Martínez**	March 18, 1991 (aged 19)	0	0	(Football Federation of Chile) Universidad Católica
5	DF	**Luis Casanova**	July 1, 1992 (aged 18)	0	0	(Football Federation of Chile) O'Higgins
6	MF	Alejandro Márquez	October 31, 1991 (aged 19)	0	0	(Football Federation of Chile) Unión Temuco
7	MF	**Bryan Carrasco**	January 31, 1991 (aged 19)	0	0	(Football Federation of Chile) Audax Italiano
8	MF	Diego González Reyes	January 16, 1991 (aged 20)	0	0	(Football Federation of Chile) O'Higgins
9	FW	Yashir Pinto	February 6, 1991 (aged 19)	0	0	(Football Federation of Chile) Ñublense
10	MF	**César Pinares**	May 23, 1991 (aged 19)	0	0	(Italian Football Federation) Chievo
11	FW	Ramsés Bustos	October 13, 1991 (aged 19)	0	0	(Football Federation of Chile) Unión Española
12	GK	Carlos Alfaro	May 29, 1991 (aged 19)	0	0	(Football Federation of Chile) Universidad de Chile
13	MF	Enzo Guerrero	January 31, 1991 (aged 19)	0	0	(Football Federation of Chile) Coquimbo Unido
14	MF	José Luis Silva	January 7, 1991 (aged 20)	0	0	(Football Federation of Chile) Universidad de Chile
15	MF	Felipe Gallegos	December 3, 1991 (aged 19)	0	0	(Football Federation of Chile) Universidad de Chile
16	DF	Mirko Opazo	February 9, 1991 (aged 19)	0	0	(Football Federation of Chile) Colo-Colo
17	MF	**Lorenzo Reyes**	June 13, 1991 (aged 19)	0	0	(Football Federation of Chile) Huachipato
18	MF	Nicolás Peñailillo	June 13, 1991 (aged 19)	0	0	(Football Federation of Chile) Everton
19	DF	**Álvaro Ramos**	April 14, 1992 (aged 18)	0	0	(Football Federation of Chile) Deportes Iquique
20	MF	Pablo Andrés Silva	July 4, 1991 (aged 19)	0	0	(Football Federation of Chile) Unión San Felipe

== Colombia ==
Coach: Eduardo Lara

No.	Pos.	Player	Date of birth (age)	Caps	Goals	Club
1	GK	**Andrés Mosquera**	October 9, 1991 (aged 19)	0	0	(Colombian Football Federation) Bogotá
2	DF	Luciano Ospina	February 18, 1991 (aged 19)	0	0	(Colombian Football Federation) Envigado
3	DF	**Pedro Franco**	April 23, 1991 (aged 19)	0	0	(Colombian Football Federation) Millonarios
4	DF	**Santiago Arias**	January 13, 1992 (aged 19)	0	0	(Colombian Football Federation) La Equidad
5	DF	Juan Camilo Saiz	March 1, 1992 (aged 18)	0	0	(Colombian Football Federation) Envigado
6	MF	**Didier Moreno**	September 15, 1991 (aged 19)	0	0	(Colombian Football Federation) América
7	FW	Andrés Ramiro Escobar	May 14, 1991 (aged 19)	0	0	(Colombian Football Federation) Deportivo Cali
8	MF	**Edwin Cardona**	December 8, 1992 (aged 18)	0	0	(Colombian Football Federation) Atlético Nacional
9	FW	Jorge Ramos	October 2, 1992 (aged 18)	0	0	(Colombian Football Federation) Real Cartagena
10	MF	Michael Ortega	April 6, 1991 (aged 19)	0	0	(Mexican Football Federation) Atlas
11	FW	**Fabian Castillo**	June 17, 1992 (aged 18)	0	0	(Colombian Football Federation) Deportivo Cali
12	GK	Juan Sebastián Villate	February 14, 1991 (aged 19)	0	0	(Colombian Football Federation) Millonarios
13	MF	Juan David Cabezas	February 27, 1991 (aged 19)	0	0	(Colombian Football Federation) Deportivo Cali
14	DF	Juan David Díaz	October 10, 1992 (aged 18)	0	0	(Colombian Football Federation) Deportivo Pasto
15	MF	Deiner Cordoba	April 21, 1992 (aged 18)	0	0	(Colombian Football Federation) Deportivo Pereira
16	MF	Miguel Julio	February 21, 1992 (aged 18)	0	0	(Colombian Football Federation) Independiente Medellín
17	MF	Javier Calle	April 29, 1991 (aged 19)	0	0	(Colombian Football Federation) Independiente Medellín
18	MF	**Gustavo Cuellar**	October 14, 1992 (aged 18)	0	0	(Colombian Football Federation) Deportivo Cali
19	DF	Sebastián Viáfara	April 2, 1991 (aged 19)	0	0	(Colombian Football Federation) Deportes Quindío
20	MF	**Stiven Mendoza**	June 27, 1992 (aged 18)	0	0	(Colombian Football Federation) Envigado

== Ecuador ==
Coach: Sixto Vizuete

No.	Pos.	Player	Date of birth (age)	Caps	Goals	Club
1	GK	John Sebastián Jaramillo	September 15, 1991 (aged 19)	?	?	(Ecuadorian Football Federation) LDU Quito
2	DF	**Mario Pineida**	July 6, 1992 (aged 18)	?	?	(Ecuadorian Football Federation) Independiente José Terán
3	DF	**John Narváez**	June 12, 1991 (aged 19)	?	?	(Ecuadorian Football Federation) Deportivo Cuenca
4	MF	**Dixon Arroyo**	June 1, 1992 (aged 18)	?	?	(Ecuadorian Football Federation) Deportivo Quito
5	MF	**Dennys Quiñónez**	March 12, 1992 (aged 18)	?	?	(Ecuadorian Football Federation) Barcelona
6	DF	Edder Fuentes	March 27, 1992 (aged 18)	?	?	(Ecuadorian Football Federation) El Nacional
7	MF	**Fernando Gaibor**	October 8, 1991 (aged 19)	?	?	(Ecuadorian Football Federation) Emelec
8	MF	**Cristian Penilla**	May 2, 1991 (aged 19)	?	?	(Ecuadorian Football Federation) ESPOLI
9	FW	**Marlon de Jesús**	September 4, 1991 (aged 19)	?	?	(Ecuadorian Football Federation) El Nacional
10	MF	**Juan Cazares**	April 3, 1992 (aged 18)	?	?	(Argentine Football Association) River Plate
11	MF	**Marcos Caicedo**	November 1, 1991 (aged 19)	?	?	(Ecuadorian Football Federation) Emelec
12	GK	Walter Chávez	April 6, 1994 (aged 16)	?	?	(Ecuadorian Football Federation) LDU Quito
13	FW	**Edson Montaño**	March 15, 1991 (aged 19)	?	?	(Royal Belgian Football Association) Gent
14	DF	**Renato Ibarra**	March 15, 1991 (aged 19)	?	?	(Ecuadorian Football Federation) El Nacional
15	DF	Fernando Pinillo	March 27, 1991 (aged 19)	?	?	(Ecuadorian Football Federation) Emelec
16	MF	Christian Oña	January 23, 1993 (aged 17)	?	?	(Ecuadorian Football Federation) Independiente José Terán
17	MF	Erik Minda	January 20, 1991 (aged 19)	?	?	(Ecuadorian Football Federation) El Nacional
18	MF	Jonathan de la Cruz	July 18, 1992 (aged 18)	?	?	(Ecuadorian Football Federation) Universidad Católica
19	DF	Eddye Noboa	September 11, 1991 (aged 19)	?	?	(Ecuadorian Football Federation) Rocafuerte
20	FW	**Walter Chala**	February 24, 1992 (aged 18)	?	?	(Ecuadorian Football Federation) Deportivo Cuenca

== Paraguay ==
Coach: Adrian Coria (Argentina)

No.	Pos.	Player	Date of birth (age)	Caps	Goals	Club
1	GK	Mario Ovando	February 22, 1991 (aged 19)			(Paraguayan Football Association) Olimpia
2	DF	Raúl Cáceres	September 18, 1991 (aged 19)			(Paraguayan Football Association) Olimpia
3	DF	**Gustavo Gómez**	May 6, 1993 (aged 17)			(Paraguayan Football Association) Libertad
4	DF	Nelson Ruiz Giménez	December 27, 1991 (aged 19)			(Paraguayan Football Association) Cerro Porteño
5	DF	Diego Viera	April 30, 1991 (aged 19)			(Paraguayan Football Association) Club Rubio Ñu
6	MF	Marcos Giménez	January 25, 1991 (aged 19)			(Paraguayan Football Association) Libertad
7	MF	Hernán Pérez	February 12, 1991 (aged 19)			(Paraguayan Football Association) Olimpia
8	MF	Diego Benítez	February 18, 1991 (aged 19)			(Paraguayan Football Association) Olimpia
9	FW	Cláudio Correa	May 13, 1991 (aged 19)			(Paraguayan Football Association) Sportivo Luqueño
10	MF	**Iván Torres**	February 27, 1991 (aged 19)			(Paraguayan Football Association) Cerro Porteño
11	MF	**Óscar Ruiz**	May 14, 1991 (aged 19)			(Paraguayan Football Association) Libertad
12	GK	Rubén Escobar	February 6, 1991 (aged 19)			(Paraguayan Football Association) Libertad
13	DF	Fernando Acuña	August 31, 1992 (aged 18)			(Paraguayan Football Association) Libertad
14	DF	Arnaldo Recalde	May 21, 1991 (aged 19)			(Paraguayan Football Association) Libertad
15	MF	**Iván Vargas**	April 5, 1991 (aged 19)			(Paraguayan Football Association) Guaraní
16	MF	Darío Ferreira	February 16, 1991 (aged 19)			(Paraguayan Football Association) Cerro Porteño
17	MF	Alberto Contrera	February 14, 1992 (aged 18)			(Paraguayan Football Association) Olimpia
18	FW	Brian Montenegro	June 10, 1993 (aged 17)			(Paraguayan Football Association) Tacuary
19	FW	Jorge Ortega	April 16, 1991 (aged 19)			(Paraguayan Football Association) Tacuary
20	FW	Miguel Medina	June 1, 1993 (aged 17)			(Italian Football Federation) Udinese

== Peru ==
Coach: Gustavo Ferrín (Uruguay)

No.	Pos.	Player	Date of birth (age)	Caps	Goals	Club
1	GK	**Carlos Caceda**	September 27, 1991 (aged 19)			(Peruvian Football Federation) Universitario
2	DF	Diego Donayre	April 6, 1991 (aged 19)			(Peruvian Football Federation) Alianza Lima
3	DF	Jorge Bosmediano	February 16, 1991 (aged 19)			(Peruvian Football Federation) Universidad San Martín
4	DF	José Granda	April 13, 1992 (aged 18)			(Peruvian Football Federation) Sporting Cristal
5	DF	Diego Otoya	May 7, 1991 (aged 19)			(Peruvian Football Federation) Universidad César Vallejo
6	DF	**Alexander Callens**	May 4, 1992 (aged 18)			(Peruvian Football Federation) Sport Boys
7	MF	**Benjamin Ubierna**	November 22, 1991 (aged 19)			(Peruvian Football Federation) Universidad San Martín
8	MF	Diego Portugal	February 23, 1991 (aged 19)			(Peruvian Football Federation) Alianza Lima
9	FW	Joazhiño Arroe	June 5, 1992 (aged 18)			(Italian Football Federation) Siena
10	MF	**Christian Cueva**	November 23, 1991 (aged 19)			(Peruvian Football Federation) Universidad San Martín
11	DF	Renato Zapata	February 16, 1992 (aged 18)			(Peruvian Football Federation) Universitario
12	GK	Víctor Ulloa	March 15, 1991 (aged 19)			(Peruvian Football Federation) Colegio Nacional Iquitos
13	MF	Claudio Torrejón	May 14, 1993 (aged 17)			(Peruvian Football Federation) Sporting Cristal
14	DF	**Carlos Ascues**	June 19, 1992 (aged 18)			(Peruvian Football Federation) Alianza Lima
15	FW	Jorge Bazán	March 23, 1991 (aged 19)			(Peruvian Football Federation) Alianza Lima
16	DF	**Pedro Requena**	January 24, 1991 (aged 19)			(Peruvian Football Federation) Total Chalaco
17	FW	Osnar Noronha	December 17, 1991 (aged 19)			(Peruvian Football Federation) Colegio Nacional Iquitos
18	MF	Ángel Ojeda	August 11, 1992 (aged 18)			(Peruvian Football Federation) Melgar
19	FW	**André Carrillo**	June 14, 1991 (aged 19)			(Peruvian Football Federation) Alianza Lima
20	MF	Giovanny Morales	March 10, 1992 (aged 18)			(Peruvian Football Federation) Esther Grande Bentín

== Uruguay ==
Coach: Juan Verzeri

No.	Pos.	Player	Date of birth (age)	Caps	Goals	Club
1	GK	Jhonny da Silva	August 21, 1991 (aged 19)			(Uruguayan Football Association) Tacuarembó
2	DF	Federico Platero	February 7, 1991 (aged 19)			(Uruguayan Football Association) Defensor Sporting
3	DF	Diego Polenta	February 6, 1992 (aged 18)			(Italian Football Federation) Genoa
4	DF	Nicolás Rodríguez	July 22, 1991 (aged 19)			(Uruguayan Football Association) Montevideo Wanderers
5	MF	**Guzmán Pereira**	April 16, 1991 (aged 19)			(Uruguayan Football Association) Montevideo Wanderers
6	DF	Leandro Cabrera	June 17, 1991 (aged 19)			(Royal Spanish Football Federation) Recreativo Huelva
7	FW	Adrián Luna	April 21, 1992 (aged 18)			(Uruguayan Football Association) Defensor Sporting
8	MF	**Matías Vecino**	August 24, 1991 (aged 19)			(Uruguayan Football Association) Central Español
9	FW	Federico Rodríguez	April 3, 1991 (aged 19)			(Uruguayan Football Association) Peñarol
10	MF	Pablo Ceppelini	September 11, 1991 (aged 19)			(Uruguayan Football Association) Peñarol
11	FW	Matías Jones	July 1, 1991 (aged 19)			(Uruguayan Football Association) Danubio
12	GK	Salvador Ichazo	January 26, 1992 (aged 18)			(Uruguayan Football Association) Danubio
13	DF	Maximiliano Olivera	March 5, 1992 (aged 18)			(Uruguayan Football Association) Montevideo Wanderers
14	DF	Ramón Arias	July 27, 1992 (aged 18)			(Uruguayan Football Association) Defensor Sporting
15	MF	Ángel Cayetano	January 8, 1991 (aged 20)			(Uruguayan Football Association) Danubio
16	MF	Nicolás Prieto	September 5, 1992 (aged 18)			(Uruguayan Football Association) Nacional
17	DF	Yefferson Moreira	March 7, 1991 (aged 19)			(Uruguayan Football Association) Peñarol
18	MF	**Camilo Mayada**	January 8, 1991 (aged 20)			(Uruguayan Football Association) Danubio
19	FW	Luis Machado	December 22, 1991 (aged 19)			(Uruguayan Football Association) Tacuarembó
20	MF	Sebastián Gallegos	January 18, 1992 (aged 18)			(Royal Spanish Football Federation) Atlético Madrid

== Venezuela ==
Coach: Marcos Mathias

No.	Pos.	Player	Date of birth (age)	Caps	Goals	Club
1	GK	Eduardo Lima	October 9, 1992 (aged 18)			(Venezuelan Football Federation) Monagas
2	DF	**Jhon Chancellor**	January 2, 1992 (aged 19)			(Venezuelan Football Federation) Mineros de Guayana
3	DF	Carlos Lujano	July 14, 1991 (aged 19)			(Venezuelan Football Federation) Real Esppor
4	DF	Juan Pablo Villarroel	September 13, 1991 (aged 19)			(Venezuelan Football Federation) Deportivo Petare
5	DF	Carlos Suárez	April 26, 1992 (aged 18)			(Venezuelan Football Federation) Caracas
6	DF	Carlos Rivero	November 27, 1992 (aged 18)			(Venezuelan Football Federation) Carabobo
7	DF	**Alexander González**	September 13, 1992 (aged 18)			(Venezuelan Football Federation) Caracas
8	MF	Orlando Peraza	March 19, 1991 (aged 19)			(Venezuelan Football Federation) Aragua
9	FW	Daniel Febles	February 8, 1992 (aged 18)			(Venezuelan Football Federation) Caracas
10	MF	**Yohandry Orozco**	March 19, 1991 (aged 19)	7	0	(Venezuelan Football Federation) Zulia
11	FW	José Reyes	September 19, 1992 (aged 18)			(Venezuelan Football Federation) Carabobo
12	GK	Álvaro Forero	December 19, 1991 (aged 19)			(Venezuelan Football Federation) Zamora
13	DF	**Wilker Ángel**	March 18, 1993 (aged 17)			(Venezuelan Football Federation) Trujillanos
14	DF	Edgar Mendoza	June 15, 1991 (aged 19)			(Venezuelan Football Federation) Deportivo Lara
15	MF	Mario Sánchez	June 19, 1991 (aged 19)			(Venezuelan Football Federation) Deportivo Anzoátegui
16	DF	Jackson Clavijo	January 1, 1992 (aged 19)			(Venezuelan Football Federation) Deportivo Táchira
17	FW	José Alí Meza	April 17, 1991 (aged 19)			(Venezuelan Football Federation) Mineros de Guayana
18	FW	**Josef Martínez**	May 19, 1993 (aged 17)			(Venezuelan Football Federation) Caracas
19	FW	Juan Pablo García	February 1, 1991 (aged 19)			(Venezuelan Football Federation) Deportivo Anzoátegui
20	MF	**Jesús Lugo**	September 14, 1991 (aged 19)			(Venezuelan Football Federation) Aragua
