= 2011 South American U-20 Championship =

Campeonato Sudamericano Sub-20 “Juventud de America” Perú 2011

Tournament details
- Host country: Peru
- Dates: 16 January – 12 February
- Teams: 10 (from 1 confederation)
- Venue: 3 (in 3 host cities)

Final positions
- Champions: Brazil (11th title)
- Runners-up: Uruguay
- Third place: Argentina
- Fourth place: Ecuador

Tournament statistics
- Matches played: 35
- Goals scored: 94 (2.69 per match)
- Top scorer: (Brazil) Neymar (9 goals)
- Best player: (Colombia) Pedro Franco

The 2011 South American Youth Championship (Spanish: Campeonato Sudamericano Sub-20 “Juventud de America” Perú 2011, Portuguese: Campeonato Sul-Americano Sub-20 “Juventude da America” Peru 2011) was a football competition for U-20 national teams in the South America (CONMEBOL). The tournament was held in Peru from 16 January to 12 February.

The top 4 teams qualified for the 2011 FIFA U-20 World Cup in Colombia. In addition, the top 2 teams qualified for the 2012 Summer Olympics, to be held in London, United Kingdom. As hosts of the 2011 FIFA U-20 World Cup, Colombia automatically qualified.

== Teams ==
- Argentina
- Bolivia
- Brazil
- Chile
- Colombia
- Ecuador
- Paraguay
- Peru (host)
- Uruguay
- Venezuela

== Venues ==
| Arequipa | 2011 South American U-20 Championship is located in Peru |
|---|---|
| Estadio Monumental Virgen de Chapi de la UNSA | 2011 South American U-20 Championship is located in Peru |
| Capacity: 40,000 | 2011 South American U-20 Championship is located in Peru |
| Moquegua | 2011 South American U-20 Championship is located in Peru |
| Estadio 25 de Noviembre | 2011 South American U-20 Championship is located in Peru |
| Capacity: 21,000 | 2011 South American U-20 Championship is located in Peru |
| Tacna | 2011 South American U-20 Championship is located in Peru |
| Estadio Jorge Basadre | 2011 South American U-20 Championship is located in Peru |
| Capacity: 19,850 | 2011 South American U-20 Championship is located in Peru |

== First stage ==
When teams finished level of points, the final order was determined according to:

1. superior goal difference in all matches
2. greater number of goals scored in all group matches
3. better result in matches between the tied teams
4. drawing of lots

All match times are in local Peruvian time (UTC−05:00).

=== Group A ===
| Team | Pld | W | D | L | GF | GA | GD | Pts |
|---|---|---|---|---|---|---|---|---|
| Argentina | 4 | 3 | 1 | 0 | 8 | 4 | +4 | 10 |
| Chile | 4 | 2 | 0 | 2 | 6 | 8 | −2 | 6 |
| Uruguay | 4 | 1 | 1 | 2 | 6 | 5 | +1 | 4 |
| Peru | 4 | 1 | 1 | 2 | 4 | 5 | −1 | 4 |
| Venezuela | 4 | 0 | 3 | 1 | 4 | 6 | −2 | 3 |

16 January 2011
15:00

| Argentina | 2–1 | Uruguay |
|---|---|---|
| Hoyos 58'; Iturbe 90' | Report | Polenta 37' |

Estadio Monumental Virgen de Chapi, Arequipa
Referee: Wilmar Roldán (Colombia)
16 January 2011
17:10

| Peru | 0–2 | Chile |
|---|---|---|
| | Report | Reyes 52'; Martínez 60' |

Estadio Monumental Virgen de Chapi, Arequipa
Referee: Antonio Arias (Paraguay)

19 January 2011
17:30

| Peru | 1–2 | Argentina |
|---|---|---|
| Callens 65' | Report | Funes Mori 2'; Zuculini 86' |

Estadio Monumental Virgen de Chapi, Arequipa
Referee: Wilson Seneme (Brazil)
19 January 2011
19:30

| Venezuela | 1–1 | Uruguay |
|---|---|---|
| Reyes 19' | Report | F. Rodríguez 58' |

Estadio Monumental Virgen de Chapi, Arequipa
Referee: Raúl Orosco (Bolivia)

22 January 2011
15:00

| Argentina | 1–1 | Venezuela |
|---|---|---|
| Araujo 55' | Report | Orozco 65' |

Estadio Monumental Virgen de Chapi, Arequipa
Referee: Antonio Arias (Paraguay)
22 January 2011
17:10

| Chile | 0–4 | Uruguay |
|---|---|---|
| | Report | Cepellini 10', 44'; Luna 73'; Polenta 77' |

Estadio Monumental Virgen de Chapi, Arequipa
Referee: Omar Ponce (Ecuador)

24 January 2011
18:00

| Chile | 1–3 | Argentina |
|---|---|---|
| Márquez 69' | Report | Ferreyra 58', 67'; Mosca 73' |

Estadio Monumental Virgen de Chapi, Arequipa
Referee: Raúl Orosco (Bolivia)
24 January 2011
20:10

| Peru | 1–1 | Venezuela |
|---|---|---|
| Noronha 15' | Report | Orozco 78' |

Estadio Monumental Virgen de Chapi, Arequipa
Attendance: 5,000
Referee: Wilmar Roldán (Colombia)

27 January 2011
18:00

| Chile | 3–1 | Venezuela |
|---|---|---|
| Pinto 24'; Gallegos 45'; Márquez 86' | Report | Meza 14' |

Estadio Monumental Virgen de Chapi, Arequipa
Referee: Wilson Seneme (Brazil)
27 January 2011
20:10

| Peru | 2–0 | Uruguay |
|---|---|---|
| Ojeda 15'; Donayre 71' | Report |

Estadio Monumental Virgen de Chapi, Arequipa
Referee: Omar Ponce (Ecuador)

=== Group B ===
| Team | Pld | W | D | L | GF | GA | GD | Pts |
|---|---|---|---|---|---|---|---|---|
| Brazil | 4 | 3 | 1 | 0 | 9 | 4 | +5 | 10 |
| Ecuador | 4 | 2 | 1 | 1 | 5 | 3 | +2 | 7 |
| Colombia | 4 | 1 | 2 | 1 | 7 | 8 | −1 | 5 |
| Paraguay | 4 | 1 | 1 | 2 | 6 | 8 | −2 | 4 |
| Bolivia | 4 | 0 | 1 | 3 | 3 | 7 | −4 | 1 |

17 January 2011
19:00

| Colombia | 1–1 | Ecuador |
|---|---|---|
| Cardona 71' (pen.) | Report | Cazares 29' (pen.) |

Estadio Jorge Basadre, Tacna
Referee: Víctor Hugo Carrillo (Peru)
17 January 2011
21:10

| Brazil | 4–2 | Paraguay |
|---|---|---|
| Neymar 25' (pen.), 33', 60', 63' | Report | Viera 51'; Montenegro 84' |

Estadio Jorge Basadre, Tacna
Referee: Diego Abal (Argentina)

20 January 2011
19:00

| Bolivia | 0–1 | Paraguay |
|---|---|---|
| | Report | Torres 23' |

Estadio Jorge Basadre, Tacna
Referee: Marlon Escalante (Venezuela)
20 January 2011
21:10

| Colombia | 1–3 | Brazil |
|---|---|---|
| Cardona 65' (pen.) | Report | Casemiro 55'; Willian José 63'; Neymar 86' |

Estadio Jorge Basadre, Tacna
Referee: Dario Ubriaco (Uruguay)

23 January 2011
11:30

| Brazil | 1–1 | Bolivia |
|---|---|---|
| Henrique 41' | Report | Rios 76' |

Estadio 25 de Noviembre, Moquegua
Referee: Jorge Osorio (Chile)
23 January 2011
13:40

| Ecuador | 1–0 | Paraguay |
|---|---|---|
| Montaño 60' | Report |

Estadio 25 de Noviembre, Moquegua
Referee: Dario Ubriaco (Uruguay)

25 January 2011
19:00

| Colombia | 2–1 | Bolivia |
|---|---|---|
| Franco 21'; Escobar 37' | Report | Rios 57' |

Estadio Jorge Basadre, Tacna
Referee: Víctor Hugo Carrillo (Peru)
25 January 2011
21:10

| Ecuador | 0–1 | Brazil |
|---|---|---|
| | Report | Henrique 24' |

Estadio Jorge Basadre, Tacna
Referee: Diego Abal (Argentina)

28 January 2011
19:00

| Ecuador | 3–1 | Bolivia |
|---|---|---|
| Chalá 51'; Caicedo 61'; Montaño 83' | Report | Ríos 42' |

Estadio Jorge Basadre, Tacna
Referee: Marlon Escalante (Venezuela)
28 January 2011
21:10

| Colombia | 3–3 | Paraguay |
|---|---|---|
| Cardona 39', 87'; Ortega 68' | Report | Correa 32'; Ruiz 37', 57' |

Estadio Jorge Basadre, Tacna
Referee: Jorge Osorio (Chile)

== Final stage ==
Team qualified for both the 2011 FIFA U-20 World Cup and the 2012 Summer Olympics
Team qualified for the 2011 FIFA U-20 World Cup

| Team | Pld | W | D | L | GF | GA | GD | Pts |
|---|---|---|---|---|---|---|---|---|
| Brazil | 5 | 4 | 0 | 1 | 15 | 3 | +12 | 12 |
| Uruguay | 5 | 3 | 1 | 1 | 4 | 7 | –3 | 10 |
| Argentina | 5 | 3 | 0 | 2 | 7 | 5 | +2 | 9 |
| Ecuador | 5 | 2 | 2 | 1 | 3 | 2 | +1 | 8 |
| Chile | 5 | 1 | 0 | 4 | 6 | 11 | −5 | 3 |
| Colombia | 5 | 0 | 1 | 4 | 1 | 8 | −7 | 1 |

1.As hosts of the 2011 FIFA U-20 World Cup, Colombia automatically qualified and did not need to finish in the top four to advance.

All match times are in local Peruvian time (UTC−05:00).

31 January 2011
16:50

| Uruguay | 1–0 | Colombia |
|---|---|---|
| Luna 42' | Report |

Estadio Monumental Virgen de Chapi, Arequipa
Referee: Diego Abal (Argentina)
31 January 2011
19:00

| Argentina | 0–1 | Ecuador |
|---|---|---|
| | Report | Montaño 46' |

Estadio Monumental Virgen de Chapi, Arequipa
Referee: Wilson Seneme (Brazil)
31 January 2011
21:10

| Chile | 1–5 | Brazil |
|---|---|---|
| Carrasco 19' | Report | Neymar 17', 47'; Lucas 65'; Diego Maurício 81'; Willian José 89' |

Estadio Monumental Virgen de Chapi, Arequipa
Referee: Omar Ponce (Ecuador)

3 February 2011
16:50

| Uruguay | 1–1 | Ecuador |
|---|---|---|
| Mayada 17' | Report | Montaño 59' |

Estadio Monumental Virgen de Chapi, Arequipa
Referee: Antonio Arias (Paraguay)
3 February 2011
19:00

| Chile | 2–3 | Argentina |
|---|---|---|
| Carrasco 15'; Gallegos 90+1' | Report | Ferreyra 50' (pen.); Iturbe 62'; Tagliafico 72' |

Estadio Monumental Virgen de Chapi, Arequipa
Referee: Víctor Hugo Carrillo (Peru)
3 February 2011
21:10

| Brazil | 2–0 | Colombia |
|---|---|---|
| Casemiro 3'; Diego Maurício 89' | Report |

Estadio Monumental Virgen de Chapi, Arequipa
Referee: Raúl Orosco (Bolivia)

6 February 2011
15:50

| Uruguay | 1–0 | Chile |
|---|---|---|
| Luna 37' | Report |

Estadio Monumental Virgen de Chapi, Arequipa
Referee: Wilson Seneme (Brazil)
6 February 2011
18:00

| Colombia | 0–0 | Ecuador |
|---|---|---|
| | Report |

Estadio Monumental Virgen de Chapi, Arequipa
Referee: Marlon Escalante (Venezuela)
6 February 2011
20:10

| Argentina | 2–1 | Brazil |
|---|---|---|
| Funes Mori 7' (pen.); Iturbe 68' | Report | Willian José 55' |

Estadio Monumental Virgen de Chapi, Arequipa
Referee: Wilmar Roldán (Colombia)

9 February 2011
16:50

| Colombia | 1–3 | Chile |
|---|---|---|
| Magaña 2' (o.g.) | Report | Gallegos 23'; Bustos 42'; Carrasco 47' |

Estadio Monumental Virgen de Chapi, Arequipa
Referee: Antonio Arias (Paraguay)
9 February 2011
19:00

| Uruguay | 1–0 | Argentina |
|---|---|---|
| Vecino 64' | Report |

Estadio Monumental Virgen de Chapi, Arequipa
Referee: Raúl Orosco (Bolivia)
9 February 2011
21:10

| Ecuador | 0–1 | Brazil |
|---|---|---|
| | Report | Casemiro 8' |

Estadio Monumental Virgen de Chapi, Arequipa
Referee: Víctor Hugo Carrillo (Peru)

12 February 2011
16:50

| Colombia | 0–2 | Argentina |
|---|---|---|
| | Report | Ferreyra 14' (pen.); Zuculini 32' |

Estadio Monumental Virgen de Chapi, Arequipa
Referee: Marlon Escalante (Venezuela)
12 February 2011
19:00

| Ecuador | 1–0 | Chile |
|---|---|---|
| Arroyo 72' | Report |

Estadio Monumental Virgen de Chapi, Arequipa
Referee: Wilmar Roldán (Colombia)
12 February 2011
21:10

| Uruguay | 0–6 | Brazil |
|---|---|---|
| | Report | Lucas 40', 42', 80'; Danilo 51'; Neymar 57', 62' |

Estadio Monumental Virgen de Chapi, Arequipa
Referee: Antonio Arias (Paraguay)

== Winners ==
2011 South American Youth Championship winners

Brazil
Eleventh title

== Goalscorers ==
9 goals

- (Brazil) Neymar

4 goals

- (Argentina) Facundo Ferreyra
- (Brazil) Lucas Moura
- (Colombia) Edwin Cardona
- (Ecuador) Edson Montaño

3 goals

- (Argentina) Juan Iturbe
- (Brazil) Casemiro
- (Brazil) Willian José
- (Bolivia) Darwin Rios
- (Chile) Bryan Carrasco
- (Chile) Felipe Gallegos
- (Uruguay) Adrián Luna

2 goals

- (Argentina) Rogelio Funes Mori
- (Argentina) Bruno Zuculini
- (Brazil) Henrique
- (Brazil) Diego Maurício
- (Chile) Alejandro Márquez
- (Paraguay) Óscar Ruiz
- (Uruguay) Pablo Ceppelini
- (Uruguay) Diego Polenta
- (Venezuela) Yohandry Orozco

1 goal

- (Argentina) Sergio Araujo
- (Argentina) Michael Hoyos
- (Argentina) Claudio Mosca
- (Argentina) Nicolás Tagliafico
- (Brazil) Danilo
- (Chile) Ramsés Bustos
- (Chile) José Martínez
- (Chile) Yashir Pinto
- (Chile) Lorenzo Reyes
- (Colombia) Andrés Ramiro Escobar
- (Colombia) Pedro Franco
- (Colombia) Michael Ortega

1 goal (cont.)

- (Ecuador) Dixon Arroyo
- (Ecuador) Marcos Caicedo
- (Ecuador) Juan Cazares
- (Ecuador) Walter Chala
- (Paraguay) Cláudio Correa
- (Paraguay) Brian Montenegro
- (Paraguay) Iván Torres
- (Paraguay) Diego Viera
- (Peru) Alexander Callens
- (Peru) Diego Donayre
- (Peru) Osnar Noronha
- (Peru) Angel Ojeda
- (Uruguay) Camilo Mayada
- (Uruguay) Federico Rodríguez
- (Uruguay) Matias Vecino
- (Venezuela) José Alí Meza
- (Venezuela) José Miguel Reyes

Own goal

- (Chile) Cristian Magaña (for Colombia)

== See also ==
- 2011 FIFA U-20 World Cup
- 2011 South American Under-17 Football Championship
