= 2018–19 Primera Divisió =

Primera Divisió
- Season: 2018–19
- Champions: FC Santa Coloma
- Relegated: Lusitanos; Encamp
- Champions League: FC Santa Coloma
- Europa League: Sant Julià
- Matches: 108
- Goals: 275 (2.55 per match)
- All statistics correct as of 19 May 2019.

The 2018–19 Primera Divisió, also known as Lliga Multisegur Assegurances, was the 24th season of top-tier football in Andorra.

The winner of the league this season earned a place in the preliminary round of the 2019–20 Champions League, and the second-placed club earned a place in the preliminary round of the 2019–20 Europa League.

== Teams ==
FC Ordino earned a place in the Primera Divisió this season by winning the 2017–18 Segona Divisió.

=== Clubs and locations ===
Team	Home town
Encamp	Encamp
Engordany	Escaldes-Engordany
FC Santa Coloma	Santa Coloma
Inter Club d'Escaldes	Escaldes-Engordany
Lusitanos	Andorra la Vella
FC Ordino	Ordino
Sant Julià	Sant Julià de Lòria
UE Santa Coloma	Santa Coloma

== Regular season ==
=== League table ===
Pos	Team	Pld	W	D	L	GF	GA	GD	Pts	Qualification
1	Sant Julià	21	13	6	2	42	16	+26	45	Qualification for the Championship round
2	FC Santa Coloma	21	12	7	2	32	12	+20	43	Qualification for the Championship round
3	Inter Club d'Escaldes	21	12	4	5	30	21	+9	40	Qualification for the Championship round
4	Engordany	21	8	7	6	26	24	+2	31	Qualification for the Championship round
5	Ordino	21	7	2	12	27	32	−5	23	Qualification for the Relegation round
6	UE Santa Coloma	21	5	6	10	25	29	−4	21	Qualification for the Relegation round
7	Lusitanos	21	5	4	12	21	38	−17	19	Qualification for the Relegation round
8	Encamp	21	2	4	15	16	47	−31	10	Qualification for the Relegation round

Source: FAF Soccerway
Rules for classification: 1) Points; 2) Head-to-head points; 3) Head-to-head goal difference; 4) Head-to-head goals scored; 5) Goal difference; 6) Goals scored.

=== Results ===
The eight clubs played each other three times for twenty–one matches each during the regular season.

First and second round
Home \ Away	ENC	ENG	INT	LUS	ORD	SJU	SFC	SUE
Encamp		0–1	0–2	0–3	2–0	1–2	1–3	0–1
Engordany	3–0		1–0	1–1	1–0	1–4	0–2	2–1
Inter Club d'Escaldes	3–1	0–2		2–1	2–1	0–1	1–0	1–0
Lusitanos	1–1	4–0	0–3		2–0	0–1	1–4	1–2
Ordino	3–1	2–1	1–2	1–3		0–0	0–2	2–1
Sant Julià	4–2	1–1	3–0	5–0	1–1		1–1	1–1
FC Santa Coloma	3–0	0–0	3–1	0–0	1–0	0–0		1–2
UE Santa Coloma	5–0	0–0	1–1	0–2	2–3	1–3	1–1	

Source: soccerway.com
Legend: Blue = home team win; Yellow = draw; Red = away team win.

Third round
Home \ Away	ENC	ENG	INT	LUS	ORD	SJU	SFC	SUE
Encamp		2–2	1–1					1–1
Engordany				5–0	1–2	0–2		
Inter Club d'Escaldes		0–0		2–1		2–1	1–1	
Lusitanos	0–1				1–5	0–3		
Ordino	4–0		1–3				1–2	0–1
Sant Julià	4–2				3–0		0–2	2–1
FC Santa Coloma	1–0	1–1		2–0				2–1
UE Santa Coloma		2–3	1–3	0–0				

Source: soccerway.com
Legend: Blue = home team win; Yellow = draw; Red = away team win.

== Championship and relegation round ==
Records earned in the regular season were taken over to the Championship round and relegation round.

=== Championship round ===
Pos	Team	Pld	W	D	L	GF	GA	GD	Pts	Qualification
1	FC Santa Coloma (C)	27	15	9	3	41	18	+23	54	Qualification for the Champions League preliminary round
2	Sant Julià	27	15	8	4	52	26	+26	53	Qualification for the Europa League preliminary round
3	Inter Club d'Escaldes	27	15	6	6	39	27	+12	51	
4	Engordany	27	8	9	10	30	34	−4	33	Qualification for the Europa League preliminary round (Note: Engordany qualified for the Europa League preliminary round by winning the 2019 Copa Constitució)

Source: FAFsoccerway
Rules for classification: 1) Points; 2) Head-to-head points; 3) Head-to-head goal difference; 4) Head-to-head goals scored; 5) Goal difference; 6) Goals scored.
(C) Champions
Notes:

Home \ Away	ENG	INT	SJU	SFC
Engordany		1–1	2–2	0–1
Inter Club d'Escaldes	1–0		2–0	2–1
Sant Julià	3–0	3–2		1–1
FC Santa Coloma	2–1	1–1	3–1	

Source: FAFsoccerway
Legend: Blue = home team win; Yellow = draw; Red = away team win.

=== Relegation round ===
Pos	Team	Pld	W	D	L	GF	GA	GD	Pts	Relegation
5	Ordino	27	10	3	14	34	39	−5	33	
6	UE Santa Coloma	27	8	8	11	33	32	+1	32	
7	Lusitanos (R)	27	5	6	16	22	46	−24	21	Qualification for the relegation play-offs
8	Encamp (R)	27	5	5	17	24	53	−29	20	Relegation to the Segona Divisió

Source: FAFsoccerway
Rules for classification: 1) Points; 2) Head-to-head points; 3) Head-to-head goal difference; 4) Head-to-head goals scored; 5) Goal difference; 6) Goals scored.
(R) Relegated

Home \ Away	ENC	LUS	ORD	SUE
Encamp		1–0	4–1	0–2
Lusitanos	1–1		0–1	0–0
Ordino	1–0	3–0		0–0
UE Santa Coloma	1–2	2–0	3–1	

Source: FAFsoccerway
Legend: Blue = home team win; Yellow = draw; Red = away team win.

== Primera Divisió play-offs ==
The seventh-placed club (third-placed in the relegation round), from the 2018–19 Primera Divisió and the runners-up from the 2018–19 Segona Divisió, played in a two-legged relegation play-off for one place in the 2019–20 Primera Divisió.

22 May 2019	Carroi	1–0	Lusitanos	Centre d'Entrenaments
21:00 CEST	Munoz Caballe 70'	Report

29 May 2019	Lusitanos	1–0 (a.e.t.) (1–1 agg.) (2–4 p)	Carroi	Centre d'Entrenaments
21:00 CEST	Urrunaga 68'	Report
	Penalties
	Briñez (penalty scored); Vaamonde (penalty scored); Cortez (penalty missed); Bakayoko (penalty missed)		Munoz Caballe (penalty scored); Oliveira (penalty scored); Rojas Gomez (penalty missed); Castaneda (penalty scored); Chelli (penalty scored)

CE Carroi promoted to 2019–20 Primera Divisió; FC Lusitanos relegated to 2019–20 Segona Divisió

== Season statistics ==
=== Regular season top goalscorers ===
Rank	Player	Club	Goals
1	(Chile) Nico Medina	Lusitanos	10
2	(Spain) Joel Méndez	Sant Julià	9
3	(Spain) Genís Soldevila	Inter d'Escaldes	8
4	(Spain) Enric Pi	Sant Julià	7
4	(Andorra) Luis Blanco	Sant Julià	7

=== Regular season top goalkeepers ===
Rank	Name	Club	Goals against	Matches	Average
1	(Spain) Eloi Casals	FC Santa Coloma	9	16	0.56
2	(Spain) Joan Bayona	Inter d'Escaldes	21	21	1
3	(Spain) Jesús Coca	Engordany	20	20	1
4	(Andorra) Josep Gómes	UE Santa Coloma	27	19	1.42
5	(Brazil) Marcelo Valverde	Lusitanos	26	17	1.53

=== Championship round top goalscorers ===
Rank	Player	Club	Goals
1	(Spain) Enric Pi	Sant Julià	3
2	(Spain) Lorenzo Burón	FC Santa Coloma	2
2	(Andorra) Gabi Riera	FC Santa Coloma	2
2	(Spain) Pedro Santos	FC Santa Coloma	2
2	(Spain) Juanma Hernández	Sant Julià	2
2	(Andorra) Luis Blanco	Sant Julià	2
2	(Spain) Genís Soldevila	Inter d'Escaldes	2
2	(Uruguay) Mateo Rodríguez	Inter d'Escaldes	2

=== Relegation round top goalscorers ===
Rank	Player	Club	Goals
1	(Andorra) Aarón Sánchez	UE Santa Coloma	4
2	(Spain) Tete López	Encamp	3
3	(Spain) Cristian Hidalgo	Ordino	2
3	(Andorra) Sebas Bertran	Ordino	2
3	(Argentina) Diego Sánchez	Encamp	2

== See also ==
- Segona Divisio
- Copa Constitucio
