= 2019 Copa Constitució =

Tournament details
- Country: Andorra
- Teams: 12

Final positions
- Champions: Engordany
- Runners-up: FC Santa Coloma

Tournament statistics
- Matches played: 11
- Goals scored: 30 (2.73 per match)

The 2019 Copa Constitució was the 27th edition of the national football knockout tournament with clubs from Andorra. The cup began on 20 January 2019 and ended on 26 May 2019 with the final.

FC Santa Coloma were the defending cup champions after defeating Sant Julià in the previous season's final by a score of 2–1.

== Schedule ==
Round	Date(s)	Number of fixtures	Clubs
First round	20 January 2019	4	12 → 8
Quarter-finals	14 March 2019	4	8 → 4
Semi-finals	3 April 2019	2	4 → 2
Final	26 May 2019	1	2 → 1

== First round ==
Eight clubs competed in the first round. The matches were played on 20 January 2019.

Team 1	Score	Team 2
CE Carroi	1–3	UE Santa Coloma
Penya Encarnada	1–1 (a.e.t.) (11–10 p)	Encamp
Atlètic Club d'Escaldes	2–1	Ordino
FS La Massana	0–3	Lusitanos

== Quarter-finals ==
Eight clubs competed in the quarter-finals. The matches were played on 14 March 2019.

Team 1	Score	Team 2
Inter Club d'Escaldes	0–1 (a.e.t.)	UE Santa Coloma
Engordany	2–1	Penya Encarnada
Sant Julià	3–0	Atlètic Club d'Escaldes
FC Santa Coloma	6–0	Lusitanos

== Semifinals ==
Four clubs competed in the semifinals. The matches were played on 3–4 April 2019.

Team 1	Score	Team 2
UE Santa Coloma	0–0 (a.e.t.) (3–5 p)	Engordany
Sant Julià	1–2	FC Santa Coloma

== Final ==
The final was played on 26 May 2019.

26 May 2019
19:30

Engordany	2–0	FC Santa Coloma

Estadi Nacional, Andorra la Vella
Referee: Pedro Costa Carvalho

== See also ==
- 2018–19 Primera Divisió
- 2018–19 Segona Divisió
