= 2020 Copa Constitució =

Tournament details
- Country: Andorra
- Teams: 12

Final positions
- Champions: Inter Club d'Escaldes
- Runners-up: FC Santa Coloma

Tournament statistics
- Matches played: 11
- Goals scored: 40 (3.64 per match)

The 2020 Copa Constitució was the 28th edition of the Andorran national football knockout tournament. The opening round of this edition of the cup was played on 19 January 2020 and the final was held on 29 July 2020.

Engordany were the defending champions after winning the final over FC Santa Coloma by a score of 2–0.

On 1 July, 2020, plans were finalized for the Copa Constitució to resume on 26 July 2020 after a long delay due to the COVID-19 pandemic in Andorra.

== Schedule ==
Round	Date(s)	Number of fixtures	Clubs
First round	19 January 2020	4	12 → 8
Quarter-finals	26 January 2020	4	8 → 4
Semi-finals	26 July 2020	2	4 → 2
Final	29 July 2020	1	2 → 1

== First round ==
Eight clubs competed in the first round. The matches were played on 19 January 2020.

Team 1	Score	Team 2
Engordany	11–1	Encamp
Atlètic Club d'Escaldes	1–3	FS La Massana
Ordino	1–2	Penya Encarnada
CE Carroi	3–1	Lusitanos

== Quarter–finals ==
Eight clubs competed in the quarter–finals. The matches were played from 25 January to 12 February 2020.

Team 1	Score	Team 2
Inter Club d'Escaldes	2–1	Engordany
Sant Julià	4–0	FS La Massana
UE Santa Coloma	1–0	Penya Encarnada
FC Santa Coloma	3–0	CE Carroi

== Semi–finals ==
The four quarter–final winners competed in the semi–finals. The matches were played on 26 July 2020.

Team 1	Score	Team 2
Inter Club d'Escaldes	2–1	Sant Julià
UE Santa Coloma	0–1 (a.e.t.)	FC Santa Coloma

== Final ==
The final was played on 29 July 2020.

29 July 2020
20:30

Inter Club d'Escaldes	2–0	FC Santa Coloma
	Report

Estadi Nacional, Andorra la Vella
Referee: Bruno Parente Fernandes

== See also ==
- 2019–20 Primera Divisió
- 2019–20 Segona Divisió
