= 2018–19 Segona Divisió =

Segona Divisió
- Season: 2018–19
- Champions: Atlètic Club d'Escaldes
- Promoted: Atlètic Club d'Escaldes; Carroi
- Matches: 105
- Goals: 543 (5.17 per match)
- All statistics correct as of 19 May 2019.

The 2018–19 Segona Divisió, also known as Lliga Segona Divisió Sènior, was the 20th season of second-tier football in Andorra. The season began on 15 September 2018 and ended on 19 May 2019.

After winning the league in the previous season, Ordino were promoted to the 2018–19 Primera Divisió.

== Format ==
Eleven clubs competed for the league title. The clubs played each other twice for a total of 18 matches for each club. The three "B" teams could not be promoted. Six clubs then advanced to a play-off to determine which would earn promotion.

== League table ==
Pos	Team	Pld	W	D	L	GF	GA	GD	Pts	Qualification
1	Atlètic Club d'Escaldes	18	15	1	2	82	15	+67	46	Advance to play-off round
2	Carroi	18	15	0	3	62	22	+40	45	Advance to play-off round
3	La Massana	18	13	1	4	79	24	+55	40	Advance to play-off round
4	Penya Encarnada	18	12	2	4	53	21	+32	38	Advance to play-off round
5	Inter Club d'Escaldes B	18	8	1	9	43	30	+13	25	
6	UE Santa Coloma B	18	7	1	10	31	45	−14	22	
7	Encamp B	18	6	2	10	23	43	−20	20	
8	Ràngers	18	4	1	13	31	74	−43	13	Advance to play-off round
9	UE Extremenya	18	3	3	12	30	60	−30	12	Advance to play-off round
10	Sporting Club d'Escaldes	18	1	0	17	20	120	−100	3	
11	Jenlai (Note: Jenlai retired from competition.)	0	0	0	0	0	0	0	0	Retired

Source: FAF
Rules for classification: 1) points; 2) head-to-head points; 3) head-to-head goal difference; 4) head-to-head goals scored; 5) goal difference; 6) goals scored

== Results ==
Home \ Away	ACE	CAR	ENC	EXT	INT	JEN	MAS	PEN	RAN	SPO	SUE
Atlètic Club d'Escaldes		5–1	4–0	2–2	1–0		3–1	4–0	13–0	11–1	2–1
Carroi	1–2		1–0	4–0	3–0		3–2	1–0	2–0	14–1	2–1
Encamp B	0–7	1–5		0–2	0–4		0–4	1–1	2–1	4–2	1–2
UE Extremenya	0–5	1–5	2–4		0–5		2–4	0–2	2–2	5–0	2–3
Inter Club d'Escaldes B	1–4	3–5	0–1	1–3			3–1	0–4	7–0	3–2	0–2
Jenlai											
La Massana	3–1	1–2	1–1	9–2	3–1			4–2	9–0	6–1	8–2
Penya Encarnada	1–0	1–0	3–0	5–1	1–1		0–2		3–1	12–0	2–1
Ràngers	3–5	2–4	1–3	2–1	0–3		0–7	4–5		4–3	4–2
Sporting Club d' Escaldes	0–12	0–5	0–3	5–3	0–8		0–11	1–6	1–6		3–4
UE Santa Coloma B	0–1	2–4	3–2	2–2	0–3		1–3	0–5	2–1	3–0	

Source: FAF
Legend: Blue = home team win; Yellow = draw; Red = away team win.
For upcoming matches, an "a" indicates there is an article about the rivalry between the two participants.

== Play–off round ==
Pos	Team	Pld	W	D	L	GF	GA	GD	Pts	Promotion or qualification
1	Atlètic Club d'Escaldes (C, P)	23	19	2	2	104	19	+85	59	Promotion to Primera Divisió
2	Carroi (P)	23	17	2	4	75	29	+46	53	Qualification to play-offs
3	La Massana	23	16	2	5	104	33	+71	50	
4	Penya Encarnada	23	15	2	6	70	31	+39	47	
5	Ràngers	23	4	2	17	38	101	−63	14	
6	UE Extremenya	23	3	4	16	35	92	−57	13	

Source: FAF
Rules for classification: 1) points; 2) head-to-head points; 3) head-to-head goal difference; 4) head-to-head goals scored; 5) goal difference; 6) goals scored
(C) Champions; (P) Promoted

=== Results ===
Home \ Away	ACE	CAR	EXT	MAS	PEN	RAN
Atlètic Club d'Escaldes		1–1			2–0	
Carroi			10–1		0–4	
UE Extremenya	0–5			0–10		
La Massana	3–5	1–1				7–1
Penya Encarnada			4–1	2–4		7–3
Ràngers	0–9	0–1	3–3			

Source: FAF
Legend: Blue = home team win; Yellow = draw; Red = away team win.
For upcoming matches, an "a" indicates there is an article about the rivalry between the two participants.

== See also ==
- 2018–19 Primera Divisió
- 2019 Copa Constitució
