= 2021 Copa Constitució =

Tournament details
- Country: Andorra
- Teams: 12

Final positions
- Champions: Sant Julià
- Runners-up: Atlètic Club d'Escaldes

Tournament statistics
- Matches played: 11
- Goals scored: 36 (3.27 per match)

The 2021 Copa Constitució was the 29th edition of the Andorran national football knockout tournament. The opening round of this edition of the cup was played on 17 February 2021.

Inter Club d'Escaldes were the defending champions after winning the final over FC Santa Coloma by a score of 2–0.

== Schedule ==
| Round | Date(s) | Number of fixtures | Clubs |
|---|---|---|---|
| First round | 17–18 February 2021 | 4 | 12 → 8 |
| Quarter-finals | 2–3 March 2021 | 4 | 8 → 4 |
| Semi-finals | 14–15 April 2021 | 2 | 4 → 2 |
| Final | 30 May 2021 | 1 | 2 → 1 |

== First round ==
Eight clubs competed in the first round. The matches were played on played on 17 and 18 February 2021.

| Team 1 | Score | Team 2 |
|---|---|---|
| Carroi (1) | 2–0 | Atlètic Amèrica (2) |
| Penya Encarnada d'Andorra (1) | 2–1 | Ordino (2) |
| FC Santa Coloma (1) | 7–0 | Encamp (2) |
| UE Santa Coloma (1) | 4–0 | La Massana (2) |

== Quarter–finals ==
Eight clubs competed in the quarter–finals: the four winners from the first round and four clubs receiving a bye.

| Team 1 | Score | Team 2 |
|---|---|---|
| Inter Club d'Escaldes (1) | 2–0 | Carroi (1) |
| Sant Julià (1) | 4–1 | Penya Encarnada d'Andorra (1) |
| Engordany (1) | 0–1 | FC Santa Coloma (1) |
| Atlètic Club d'Escaldes (1) | 3–0 | UE Santa Coloma (1) |

== Semi–finals ==
The four quarter–final winners competed in the semi–finals.

| Team 1 | Score | Team 2 |
|---|---|---|
| Inter Club d'Escaldes (1) | 1–2 | Sant Julià (1) |
| FC Santa Coloma (1) | 1–2 | Atlètic Club d'Escaldes (1) |

== Final ==
The final was played between the winners of the semi-finals on 30 May 2021.

30 May 2021
18:00

| Sant Julià (1) | 2–1 | Atlètic Club d'Escaldes (1) |
|---|---|---|
| | Report |

Estadi Nacional, Andorra la Vella
Referee: Rui Miguel Maciel Queiros

== See also ==
- 2020–21 Primera Divisió
- 2020–21 Segona Divisió
