= Juanfran =

Juanfran is a hypocorism of the compound name Juan Francisco. It may refer to:

- Juanfran (footballer, born 1976), Spanish football defender, born Juan Francisco García García
- Juanfran (footballer, born 1985), Spanish football defender, born Juan Francisco Torres Belén
- Juanfran (footballer, born 1988), Spanish football winger, born Juan Francisco Moreno Fuertes
- Juan Francisco Guevara (born 1995), Spanish motorcycle racer

== See also ==
- Xisco, nickname for people have Francisco first name
- List of all pages beginning with "Juan Francisco"
