= Xisco =

Xisco is the nickname of people named Francisco. Notable people with the nickname include:

- Xisco (footballer, born 1980), Spanish footballer
- Xisco (footballer, born 1986), Spanish footballer
- Xisco Nadal (born 1986), Spanish footballer
- Xisco Pires (born 1998), Andorran footballer
