= Bryan Carrasco =

Chilean footballer (born 1991)

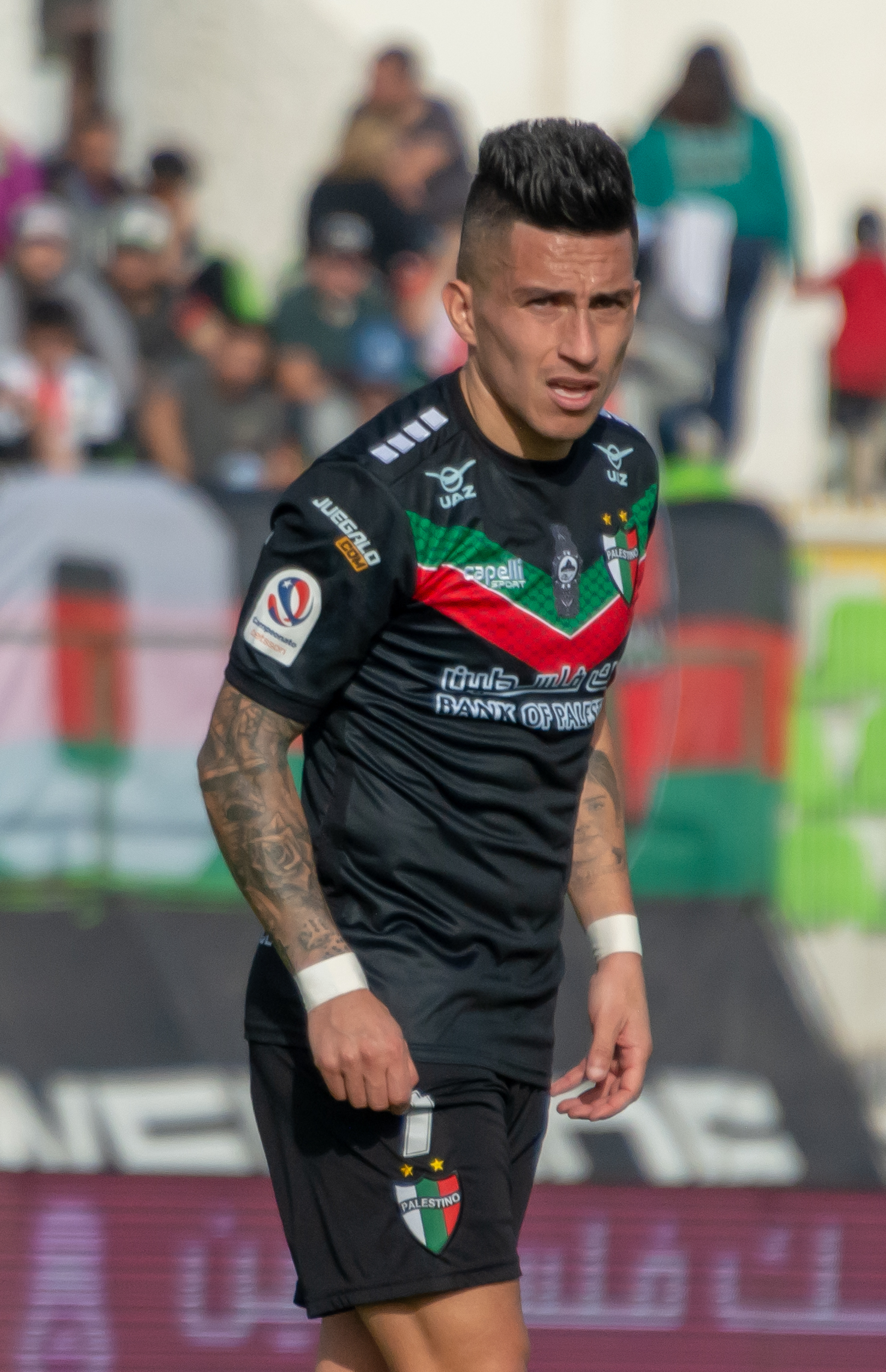

Personal information
- Full name: Bryan Paul Carrasco Santos
- Date of birth: 31 January 1991 (age 35)
- Place of birth: Santiago, Chile
- Height: 1.72 m (5 ft 8 in)
- Position: Winger

Team information
- Current team: Palestino
- Number: 7

Youth career
- 2005–2009: Audax Italiano

Senior career*
| Years | Team | Apps | (Gls) |
| 2009–2018 | Audax Italiano | 206 | (47) |
| 2012 | → Dinamo Zagreb (loan) | 3 | (0) |
| 2018–2019 | Veracruz | 31 | (5) |
| 2020– | Palestino | 176 | (45) |

International career^{‡}
| 2011 | Chile U20 | 9 | (3) |
| 2012– | Chile | 4 | (1) |
- * Club domestic league appearances and goals as of 12 May 2026 ‡ National team caps and goals as of 29 January 2015

Bryan Paul Carrasco Santos (born 31 January 1991), better known by the nickname Velocirráptor (Velociraptor) is a Chilean footballer who plays as a right winger for Chilean Primera División side Palestino.

== Club career ==
=== Audax Italiano ===
Born and raised in Población José María Caro (located in Chile's capital city Santiago), Carrasco joined the youth ranks of the professional team Audax Italiano when he was 14 in 2005.

Carrasco made his professional debut, aged 18, during a Primera División game: a 2–2 draw with Huachipato on 18 September 2009 at Estadio Municipal de Concepción, where he was replaced by Fernando Gutiérrez. The same year, he played three games as starter for the Torneo Clausura: in the 2–2 draw with Huachipato, a 4–2 loss with Deportes La Serena and a 1–1 draw with O'Higgins.

His first goals for the club came on April 24, 2010, in a 3–1 victory over Universidad de Concepción at Estadio Bicentenario de La Florida for Primera División's thirteenth matchday, where he netted a twice. The same game, he was elected the man of the match.

In 2012, he was sent on loan to Croatia's top-level Dinamo Zagreb.

In 2020, "El Velocirráptor" became Palestino's newest signing for the 2020 season. The four-colored team officially announced the arrival of the Chilean striker through social media, and he joined the team's training sessions on Thursday at La Cisterna.

== Career statistics ==
As of match played 12 May 2026

Appearances and goals by club, season and competition
| Club | Season | League | | | National Cup | | Continental | | Other | | Total | |
| Club | Season | Division | Apps | Goals | Apps | Goals | Apps | Goals | Apps | Goals | Apps | Goals |
|---|---|---|---|---|---|---|---|---|---|---|---|---|
| Audax Italiano | 2009 | Liga de Primera | 3 | 0 | — | | — | | — | | 3 | 0 |
| Audax Italiano | 2010 | Liga de Primera | 8 | 2 | — | | — | | — | | 8 | 2 |
| Audax Italiano | 2011 | Liga de Primera | 32 | 4 | — | | — | | — | | 32 | 4 |
| Audax Italiano | 2012 | Liga de Primera | 20 | 2 | — | | — | | — | | 20 | 2 |
| Total | | | 63 | 8 | — | | — | | — | | 63 | 8 |
| Dinamo Zagreb (loan) | 2012–13 | Croatian Football League | 3 | 0 | — | | 2 | 0 | — | | 20 | 2 |
| Audax Italiano | 2013 | Liga de Primera | 13 | 2 | 4 | 0 | — | | — | | 17 | 2 |
| Audax Italiano | 2013–14 | Liga de Primera | 32 | 7 | 1 | 0 | — | | — | | 33 | 7 |
| Audax Italiano | 2014–15 | Liga de Primera | 33 | 11 | 5 | 1 | — | | — | | 38 | 12 |
| Audax Italiano | 2015–16 | Liga de Primera | 9 | 0 | 9 | 2 | — | | — | | 18 | 2 |
| Audax Italiano | 2016–17 | Liga de Primera | 26 | 6 | 4 | 2 | — | | — | | 30 | 8 |
| Audax Italiano | 2017 | Liga de Primera | 30 | 13 | — | | 2 (Note: Two appearances in Copa Sudamericana) | 0 | — | | 32 | 13 |
| Total | | | 143 | 39 | 23 | 5 | 2 | 0 | — | | 168 | 44 |
| Veracruz | 2018–19 | Liga MX | 31 | 5 | 8 | 1 | — | | — | | 39 | 6 |
| Palestino | 2020 | Liga de Primera | 30 | 7 | — | | 4 (Note: Four appearances in Copa Libertadores) | 1 | — | | 34 | 8 |
| Palestino | 2021 | Liga de Primera | 29 | 13 | 5 | 0 | 8 (Note: Eight appearances in Copa Libertadores) | 1 | — | | 42 | 14 |
| Palestino | 2022 | Liga de Primera | 27 | 7 | 2 | 0 | — | | — | | 29 | 7 |
| Palestino | 2023 | Liga de Primera | 30 | 5 | 2 | 0 | 7 (Note: Seven appearances in Copa Sudamericana) | 2 | — | | 39 | 7 |
| Palestino | 2024 | Liga de Primera | 25 | 9 | 5 | 3 | 14 (Note: Ten appearances in Copa Libertadores and Four appearances in Copa Sudamericana) | 2 | — | | 44 | 14 |
| Palestino | 2025 | Liga de Primera | 26 | 4 | 4 | 1 | 9 (Note: Nine appearances in Copa Sudamericana) | 3 | — | | 39 | 8 |
| Palestino | 2026 | Liga de Primera | 9 | 0 | 3 | 1 | 5 (Note: Five appearances in Copa Sudamericana) | 0 | — | | 17 | 1 |
| Total | | | 176 | 45 | 21 | 5 | 47 | 9 | — | | 244 | 59 |
| Career total | | | 416 | 97 | 52 | 11 | 51 | 9 | — | | 534 | 119 |

== International career ==
=== Chile U20 ===
In January 2011, Carrasco was nominated by César Vaccia to play for the Chilean under-20 team the 2011 South American Youth Championship in Peru, and debuted as a starter against the host team and scored one goal in a 2–0 victory at Estadio Monumental Virgen de Chapi. He gained notoriety for an incident during Chile's 1–0 loss to Ecuador in the final group's last match, in which he grabbed Ecuador forward Edson Montaño's arm and swung it into his face in his successful attempt to gain a free kick.

=== Senior team ===
On April 11, 2012, he scored in a 3–0 friendly win over Peru at Estadio Jorge Basadre.

==== International goals ====
| Goal | Date | Venue | Opponent | Score | Result | Competition |
|---|---|---|---|---|---|---|
| 1 | 11 April 2012 | Estadio Jorge Basadre, Tacna, Perú | Peru | 0-3 | 0-3 | Friendly |
