= Rubén Garcés (footballer) =

Spanish footballer

Personal information
- Full name: Rubén Garcés Sobrevia
- Date of birth: 7 November 1993 (age 33)
- Place of birth: Huesca, Spain
- Height: 1.86 m (6 ft 1 in)
- Position: Centre-back

Team information
- Current team: Penya Encarnada
- Number: 21

Youth career
- 1998–2012: Huesca

Senior career*
Years	Team	Apps	(Gls)
2012–2014	Huesca	24	(0)
2012–2013	Almudévar	32	(4)
2014–2016	Toledo	44	(2)
2016–2017	Arandina	33	(2)
2017–2018	La Nucía	28	(2)
2019	Ejea	12	(0)
2019–2021	Alcoyano	24	(1)
2021–2022	Ejea	37	(4)
2022–2023	Utebo	21	(0)
2023–2024	Penya Encarnada	19	(1)
2024–2025	Malappuram		
2025–	Penya Encarnada	9	(0)
- * Club domestic league appearances and goals as of 15 June 2026

Rubén Garcés Sobrevia (born 7 November 1993) is a Spanish professional footballer who plays for Penya Encarnada as a central defender.

== Club career ==
Born in Huesca, Aragon, Garcés joined SD Huesca's academy in 1999, aged 5. On 7 January 2012, while still a junior, he made his official debut with the first team, playing the full 90 minutes in a 2–0 away loss against FC Cartagena in the Segunda División. He finished his youth career in 2012, being subsequently sent to farm team AD Almudévar.

In the summer of 2013, after achieving promotion to Tercera División with his parent club's reserves, Garcés was promoted to the main squad. On 5 July of the following year, he signed for Segunda División B side CD Toledo.
