= 2019–20 Primera Divisió =

Primera Divisió
- Season: 2019–20
- Dates: 15 September 2019 - 23 July 2020
- Champions: Inter Club d'Escaldes
- Relegated: Ordino
- Champions League: Inter Club d'Escaldes
- Europa League: FC Santa Coloma
- Matches: 96
- Goals: 246 (2.56 per match)
- Top goalscorer: Genís Soldevila (14 goals)
- Biggest home win: FC Santa Coloma 5–0 Atlètic Club d'Escaldes (16 February 2020); Inter Club d'Escaldes 5–0 Ordino (1 March 2020)
- Biggest away win: Ordino 0–5 FC Santa Coloma (6 October 2019); Ordino 0–5 Inter Club d'Escaldes (1 December 2019)
- Highest scoring: Engordany 2–5 Sant Julià (15 September 2019)
- Longest winning run: 6 matches Inter Club d'Escaldes
- Longest unbeaten run: 11 matches Engordany
- Longest winless run: 14 matches Ordino
- Longest losing run: 6 matches Ordino

The 2019–20 Primera Divisió, also known as Lliga Multisegur Assegurances for sponsorship reasons, was the 25th season of top-tier football in Andorra. The season began on 15 September 2019 and concluded on 23 July 2020, with Inter Club d'Escaldes winning their first title.

FC Santa Coloma were the defending league champions.

After a four month delay due to the COVID-19 pandemic in Andorra, it was announced that the league would return on 5 July 2020 to finish the regular season and then proceed to the playoffs, which will be halved.

== Teams ==
At the conclusion of the previous season, Lusitanos and Encamp were relegated. Atlètic Club d'Escaldes and Carroi replaced those two after being promoted from the Segona Divisió.

== Regular season ==
=== League table ===
Pos	Team	Pld	W	D	L	GF	GA	GD	Pts	Qualification
1	Inter Club d'Escaldes	21	14	5	2	37	13	+24	47	Qualification for the Championship round
2	FC Santa Coloma	21	13	5	3	43	11	+32	44	Qualification for the Championship round
3	Sant Julià	21	11	3	7	26	23	+3	36	Qualification for the Championship round
4	Engordany	21	10	5	6	33	26	+7	35	Qualification for the Championship round
5	UE Santa Coloma	21	9	5	7	25	23	+2	32	Qualification for the Relegation round
6	Atlètic Club d'Escaldes	21	6	5	10	23	27	−4	23	Qualification for the Relegation round
7	Ordino	21	2	3	16	15	52	−37	9	Qualification for the Relegation round
8	Carroi	21	2	3	16	11	38	−27	9	Qualification for the Relegation round

Source: FAFSoccerway
Rules for classification: 1) Points; 2) Head-to-head points; 3) Head-to-head goal difference; 4) Head-to-head goals scored; 5) Goal difference; 6) Goals scored.

=== Results ===
The eight clubs will play each other three times for twenty–one matches each during this phase of the league.

=== Rounds 1–14 ===
Home \ Away	ACE	CAR	ENG	INT	ORD	SJU	SFC	SUE
Atlètic Club d'Escaldes		1–2	2–0	1–3	2–0	0–0	1–2	0–1
Carroi	0–0		0–3	1–2	1–1	0–2	0–3	0–3
Engordany	3–1	3–1		1–1	3–1	2–5	1–1	1–1
Inter Club d'Escaldes	1–2	2–0	2–0		1–0	1–0	1–0	1–1
Ordino	1–1	2–2	1–2	0–5		1–3	0–5	2–1
Sant Julià	1–0	1–0	0–3	0–0	3–2		0–3	3–0
FC Santa Coloma	2–0	1–0	0–1	1–1	1–0	0–1		2–0
UE Santa Coloma	1–1	1–0	0–1	0–2	1–0	1–0	2–2	

Source: Soccerway
Legend: Blue = home team win; Yellow = draw; Red = away team win.

=== Rounds 15–21 ===
Home \ Away	ACE	CAR	ENG	INT	ORD	SJU	SFC	SUE
Atlètic Club d'Escaldes			1–1	0–1	4–0			0–2
Carroi	1–2		1–2		1–2			
Engordany				2–3	3–1	0–1		1–1
Inter Club d'Escaldes		2–0			5–0		1–1	1–3
Ordino						1–3	0–3	0–2
Sant Julià	0–4	1–0		0–1			1–1	
FC Santa Coloma	5–0	4–0	2–0					
UE Santa Coloma		0–1				3–1	1–4	

Source: Soccerway
Legend: Blue = home team win; Yellow = draw; Red = away team win.

== Championship and relegation rounds ==
Regular season records are carried over to championship and relegation rounds. Clubs will play other clubs in their group once for three matches each.

=== Championship round ===
Pos	Team	Pld	W	D	L	GF	GA	GD	Pts	Qualification
1	Inter Club d'Escaldes (C)	24	15	7	2	41	14	+27	52	Qualification for the Champions League preliminary round
2	FC Santa Coloma	24	15	6	3	48	12	+36	51	Qualification for the Europa League preliminary round (Note: Since both finalists of the 2020 Copa Constitució have qualified for the European competition based on league position, the Europa League spot was passed to the third-placed team.)
3	Engordany	24	11	6	7	35	29	+6	39	Qualification for the Europa League preliminary round
4	Sant Julià	24	11	3	10	27	30	−3	36	

Source: FAF soccerway
Rules for classification: 1) Points; 2) Head-to-head points; 3) Head-to-head goal difference; 4) Head-to-head goals scored; 5) Goal difference; 6) Goals scored.
(C) Champions
Notes:

Home \ Away	ENG	INT	SJU	SFC
Engordany		0–0		
Inter Club d'Escaldes			3–0	
Sant Julià	1–2			0–2
FC Santa Coloma	2–0	1–1		

Source: soccerway
Legend: Blue = home team win; Yellow = draw; Red = away team win.

=== Relegation round ===
Pos	Team	Pld	W	D	L	GF	GA	GD	Pts	Relegation
5	UE Santa Coloma	24	11	6	7	34	26	+8	39	
6	Atlètic Club d'Escaldes	24	8	6	10	32	29	+3	30	
7	Carroi (O)	24	3	3	18	14	42	−28	12	Qualification for the relegation play-offs
8	Ordino (R)	24	2	3	19	15	64	−49	9	Relegation to the Segona Divisió

Source: FAF soccerway
Rules for classification: 1) Points; 2) Head-to-head points; 3) Head-to-head goal difference; 4) Head-to-head goals scored; 5) Goal difference; 6) Goals scored.
(O) Play-off winners; (R) Relegated

Home \ Away	ACE	CAR	ORD	SUE
Atlètic Club d'Escaldes			5–0	
Carroi	0–2			
Ordino		0–2		0–5
UE Santa Coloma	2–2	2–1		

Source: soccerway
Legend: Blue = home team win; Yellow = draw; Red = away team win.

== Primera Divisió play-offs ==
The seventh-placed team (third-placed in the relegation round) from the 2019–20 Primera Divisió and the runners-up from the 2019–20 Segona Divisió, played a relegation play-off for a place in the 2020–21 Primera Divisió. A two-legged play-off was supposed to be held on 25 and 28 July 2020, but was postponed due to a positive COVID-19 case within La Massana. As a result, the play-off was changed to a single match.

1 August 2020
10:00

Carroi	4–1	La Massana
Barroso 37', 66'; Rodas 83'; Martins 86' (pen.)		Fernandez 80'

Centre d'Entrenament de la FAF, Santa Coloma

== Season statistics ==
=== Regular season top goalscorers ===
As of 23 July 2020

Rank	Player	Club	Goals
1	(Spain) Genís Soldevila	Inter d'Escaldes	16
2	(Uruguay) Bruno Lemiechevsky	Sant Julià	9
3	(Chile) Nico Medina	FC Santa Coloma	8

=== Regular season top goalkeepers ===
As of 23 July 2020

Rank	Name	Club	Goals against	Matches	Average
1	(Spain) Eloy Casals	FC Santa Coloma	12	24	0.5
2	(Andorra) Josep Gómes	Inter d'Escaldes	14	24	0.58

== See also ==
- 2019–20 Segona Divisió
- 2020 Copa Constitució
