= Juan Carlos Espinoza (Chilean footballer) =

Chilean footballer (born 1991)

Personal information
- Full name: Juan Carlos Espinoza Reyes
- Date of birth: 5 July 1991 (age 35)
- Place of birth: Talcahuano, Chile
- Height: 1.70 m (5 ft 7 in)
- Position: Right-back

Team information
- Current team: Curicó Unido
- Number: 17

Youth career
- Huachipato

Senior career*
Years	Team	Apps	(Gls)
2009–2015	Huachipato	110	(1)
2015–2019	Universidad Católica	19	(0)
2018	→ O'Higgins (loan)	10	(0)
2019	→ Audax Italiano (loan)	4	(1)
2020–2021	Coquimbo Unido	23	(0)
2021–	Curicó Unido	0	(0)

International career
2009	Chile U18		
- * Club domestic league appearances and goals as of 14 February 2021

Juan Carlos Espinoza Reyes (born 5 July 1991) is a Chilean professional footballer who plays as a right-back for Chilean Primera División side Curicó Unido.

== International career ==
Espinoza took part of the Chile squad at under-18 level at the 2009 Youth Olympic Games, where the team won the silver medal, alongside players such as Yashir Pinto, José Luis Silva, Ramsés Bustos, Johanns Dulcien, among others.

== Honours ==
=== Club ===
Huachipato

- Primera División: 2012–C

Universidad Católica

- Primera División: 2016–C, 2016–A
- Supercopa de Chile: 2016, 2019
