= Claudio Santis =

Chilean footballer (born 1992)

Personal information
- Full name: Claudio Patricio Santis Torrejón
- Date of birth: 16 October 1992 (age 34)
- Place of birth: Cartagena, Chile
- Position: Goalkeeper

Team information
- Current team: Sant Julià

Youth career
- Universidad Católica

Senior career*
Years	Team	Apps	(Gls)
2010–2015	Universidad Católica	0	(0)
2013–2014	→ Deportes Puerto Montt (loan)	1	(0)
2014–2015	→ San Antonio Unido (loan)	32	(0)
2015–2017	Deportes La Serena	13	(0)
2018	Cedar Stars Academy	–	(–)
2018	Colchagua	7	(0)
2019	Deportes Santa Cruz	2	(0)
2020	Atlético Palmaflor	10	(0)
2021–2022	Deportes Melipilla	0	(0)
2022	Sacachispas	–	(–)
2023	Trasandino	10	(0)
2024	Trasandino	0	(0)
2025	Atlètic Amèrica	8	(0)
2025–2026	Pas de la Casa	2	(0)
2026–	Sant Julià	0	(0)

International career
2007	Chile U15		
2010	Chile	0	(0)
2011	Chile U20	5	(0)
- * Club domestic league appearances and goals as of 31 March 2026

Claudio Patricio Santis Torrejón (born 16 October 1992) is a Chilean professional footballer who plays as a goalkeeper who plays for Andorran club Sant Julià.

== Club career ==
In 2014, Santis was sent on loan to Chilean second division side San Antonio Unido.

In 2018, he signed for Cedar Stars Academy in the American lower leagues.

For the 2020 season, Santis signed for Bolivian top flight club Atlético Palmaflor after struggling with weight issues in Chile.

In 2025, Santis moved to Europe and signed with Andorran club Atlètic Amèrica alongside his compatriots Ricardo Escobar and Daniel Mansilla. In August of the same year, he switched to Pas de la Casa in the Primera Divisió. He left them after the club had administrative issues.

In August 2026, Santis joined Sant Julià.

== International career ==
Santis represented Chile at under-15 level in the 2007 South American Championship and Chile U20 in the 2011 South American Championship.

At senior level, he was a substitute in the friendly match against Ukraine on 7 September 2010.
