= Johanns Dulcien =

Chilean footballer (born 1991)

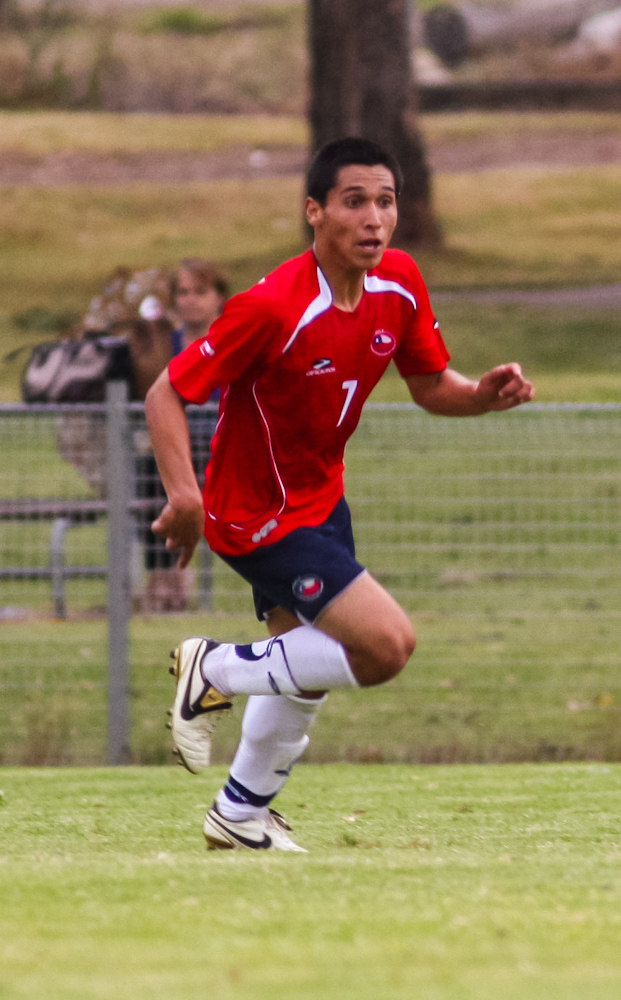
- Dulcien with the Chile U18 in 2009

Personal information
- Full name: Johanns Alexander Dulcien Neira
- Date of birth: 26 March 1991 (age 35)
- Place of birth: Tocopilla, Chile
- Height: 1.69 m (5 ft 7 in)
- Position: Attacking midfielder

Youth career
- 2002–2008: Colo-Colo

Senior career*
Years	Team	Apps	(Gls)
2009–2013	Colo-Colo	2	(0)
2010	→ Unión San Felipe (loan)	0	(0)
2011	→ Naval (loan)	1	(0)
2012	→ Deportes Melipilla (loan)	25	(3)
2013	→ San Antonio Unido (loan)	20	(7)
2013–2016	San Antonio Unido	70	(29)
2016–2017	Sahab SC	–	(–)
2017	Deportes Pintana	4	(0)
Total		122	(39)

International career
2009	Chile U18		
- * Club domestic league appearances and goals

Johanns Alexander Dulcien Neira (born 26 March 1991) is a Chilean former professional footballer who played as an attacking midfielder.

== International career ==
Dulcien took part of the Chile squad at under-18 level at the 2009 Youth Olympic Games, where the team won the silver medal, alongside players such as Yashir Pinto, José Luis Silva, Juan Carlos Espinoza, Ramsés Bustos, among others.

== Personal life ==
He got a degree in business administration at the DUOC UC and manages a company focused in home cleaning in Antofagasta, Chile.
