= Kévin Dagnet =

French footballer (born 1995)

Personal information
- Full name: Kévin Xavier Dagnet
- Date of birth: 3 November 1995 (age 30)
- Place of birth: Pointe-à-Pitre
- Height: 1.81 m (5 ft 11 in)
- Position: Defender

Team information
- Current team: Carroi
- Number: 64

Youth career
- 2013: US Ivry
- 2014: FC Plessis Robinson
- 2015–2017: Olympique Noisy-le-Sec

Senior career*
Years	Team	Apps	(Gls)
2017–2018	UJA Maccabi Paris Métropole	19	(0)
2018–2019	1. FC Lok Stendal	6	(0)
2019-2020	US Palaiseau	9	(2)
2021–2022	Aurillac FCA	7	(1)
2023–2024	Edgeworth	29	(2)
2024-2025	Fola Esch	8	(0)
2026-	Carroi	12	(1)

International career
2010	France U16	2	(0)
- * Club domestic league appearances and goals as of 15 June 2026

Kévin Xavier Dagnet (born 3 November 1995) is a French professional footballer who plays as a defender for Andorran Primera Divisió club Carroi.

== Club career ==
Born in Pointe-à-Pitre, Dagnet spent his early career playing for US Ivry, FC Plessis Robinson, Olympique Noisy-le-Se and UJA Maccabi Paris Métropole. After playing for UJA Maccabi Paris Métropole, he signed for German club 1. FC Lok Stendal in July 2018. On 19 September 2019, Dagnet signed a one-year contract with US Palaiseau on a free transfer. He moved to French Championnat National 3 club Aurillac FCA on 5 July 2021.

=== Edgeworth ===
On 15 February 2023, Dagnet joined National Premier Leagues Northern NSW side Edgeworth.

=== Fola Esch ===
Dagnet signed a contract with Fola Esch of the BGL Ligue on 28 July 2024.

== International career ==
Dagnet made his debut for France U16 in a January 2011 friendly match against Belgium U16.
