= José Luis Silva =

Chilean footballer (born 1991)

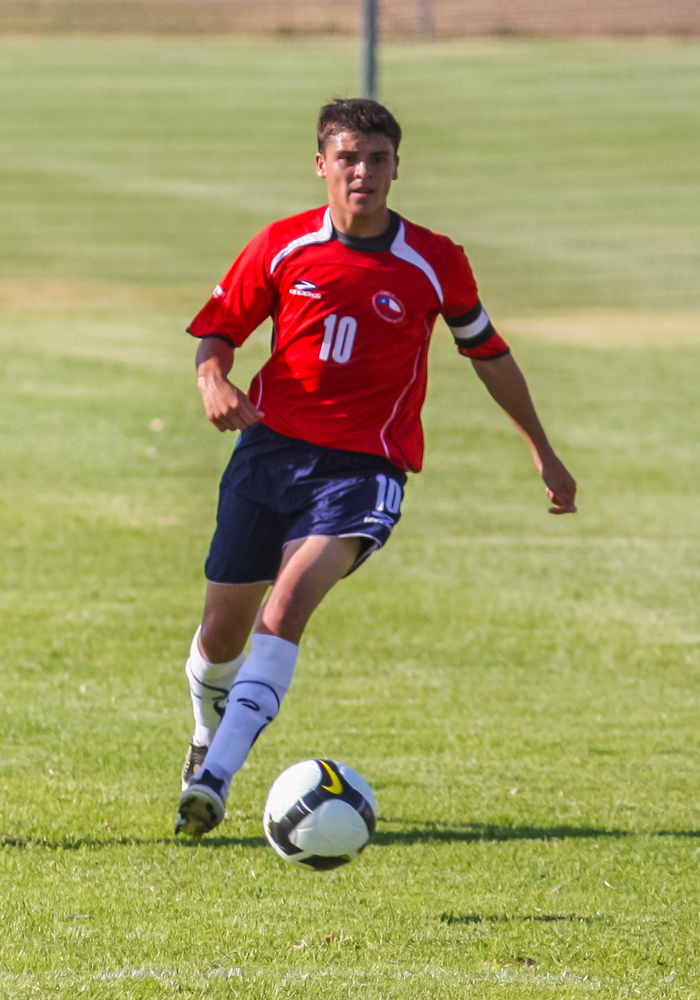
- Silva with Chile U18 in 2009

Personal information
- Full name: José Luis Silva Araya
- Date of birth: January 7, 1991 (age 35)
- Place of birth: San Bernardo, Santiago, Chile
- Height: 1.66 m (5 ft 5 1/2 in)
- Position: Attacking midfielder

Team information
- Current team: Lautaro de Buin
- Number: 14

Youth career
- Universidad de Chile

Senior career*
Years	Team	Apps	(Gls)
2008–2012	Universidad de Chile	7	(1)
2011	→ Everton (loan)	16	(2)
2012	→ Rangers (loan)	9	(1)
2012	→ Rangers B (loan)	5	(2)
2012	O'Higgins	1	(0)
2013	Kallithea	12	(0)
2013–2014	Magallanes	30	(1)
2014–2015	Deportes Iquique	10	(0)
2015–2016	Curicó Unido	31	(4)
2016–2018	Cobreloa	27	(3)
2017	→ Curicó Unido (loan)	9	(0)
2019	Deportes La Serena	22	(0)
2020	Deportes Puerto Montt	22	(2)
2021	Rangers	22	(2)
2022–	Lautaro de Buin	52	(9)

International career
2009	Chile U18		
2011	Chile U20	6	(0)
- * Club domestic league appearances and goals as of 20 November 2026

José Luis Silva Araya (born January 7, 1991) is a Chilean footballer, who plays as midfielder for Lautaro de Buin in the Segunda División Profesional de Chile.

== Club career ==
He began his career in the youth system of Universidad de Chile before making his debut in the 2008 Clausura tournament against Cobresal. In 2009 Apertura tournament he played his second match with Universidad de Chile, scoring a goal against Cobresal. For the 2011 Clausura tournament he played on loan at Everton. For 2012 he was loaned again, this time at Rangers.

A player for Lautaro de Buin since 2022, Silva helped them to get promotion to the 2027 Segunda División Profesional after they were relegated in the 2024 season.

== International career ==
Silva took part of the Chile squad at under-18 level at the 2009 Youth Olympic Games, where the team won the silver medal, alongside players such as Yashir Pinto, Ramsés Bustos, Juan Carlos Espinoza, Johanns Dulcien, among others.

In 2011, he represented Chile U20 at the South American Championship.

== Honours ==
Universidad de Chile

- Primera División de Chile (1): 2009 Apertura
