= Ricardo Escobar =

Chilean footballer (born 1998)

Personal information
- Full name: Ricardo Antonio Escobar Acuña
- Date of birth: 30 March 1998 (age 28)
- Place of birth: Santiago, Chile
- Height: 1.75 m (5 ft 9 in)
- Position: Defender

Team information
- Current team: Penya Encarnada
- Number: 4

Youth career
- Audax Italiano

Senior career*
Years	Team	Apps	(Gls)
2016–2023	Audax Italiano	35	(0)
2020–2021	→ Magallanes (loan)	7	(0)
2021–2022	→ Coquimbo Unido (loan)	19	(1)
2023	→ Deportes Valdivia (loan)	22	(1)
2024	Deportes Limache	10	(0)
2025	Atlètic Amèrica	6	(0)
2025–	Penya Encarnada	20	(0)

International career
- Chile U15
- * Club domestic league appearances and goals as of 15 June 2026

Ricardo Antonio Escobar Acuña (born 30 March 1998) is a Chilean footballer who plays as a defender for Andorran club Penya Encarnada.

== Career ==
A product of Audax Italiano youth system, Escobar was loaned to Coquimbo Unido in the 2021 season.

In 2023, Escobar was loaned to Deportes Valdivia in the Segunda División Profesional de Chile.

In 2024, Escobar joined Deportes Limache in the Primera B.

In January 2025, Escobar moved to Europe and signed with Andorran club Atlètic Amèrica alongside his compatriots Claudio Santis and Daniel Mansilla. In June of the same year, he switched to Penya Encarnada in the Primera Divisió.

== Personal life ==
Escobar studied and got a degree in business management at the same time he played professional football.

== Honours ==
Coquimbo Unido

- Primera B (1): 2021
