= 2020–21 Primera Divisió =

Primera Divisió
- Season: 2020–21
- Dates: 29 November 2020 – 23 May 2021
- Champions League: Inter Club d'Escaldes
- Europa Conference League: Sant Julià; FC Santa Coloma
- Matches: 80
- Goals: 245 (3.06 per match)
- Top goalscorer: Guillaume Lopez (16 goals)
- Biggest home win: Inter Club d'Escaldes 6–0 Penya Encarnada (14 February 2021)
- Biggest away win: Carroi 0–3 Penya Encarnada (29 November 2020)
- Highest scoring: Sant Julià 6–2 Penya Encarnada (20 December 2020)
- Longest winning run: 4 matches Inter Club d'Escaldes
- Longest unbeaten run: 6 matches Engordany
- Longest winless run: 6 matches Penya Encarnada
- Longest losing run: 5 matches Carroi
- All statistics correct as of 21 February 2021.

The 2020–21 Primera Divisió was the 26th season of top-tier football in Andorra. The season was initially scheduled to begin on 25 October 2020 and end in May 2021. Due to new restrictions related to the COVID-19 pandemic in Andorra, the start of the season was delayed. The season began on 29 November 2020. The league winner qualified to participate in the 2021–22 UEFA Champions League.

Inter Club d'Escaldes were the defending Primera Divisió champions.

== Teams ==
Ordino were relegated from the Primera Divisió after finishing in last place the previous season. As Segona Divisió champions, Penya Encarnada were promoted to replace Ordino.

== Regular season ==
=== League table ===
Pos	Team	Pld	W	D	L	GF	GA	GD	Pts	Qualification
1	Inter Club d'Escaldes	14	7	5	2	22	7	+15	26	Qualification for the Championship round
2	FC Santa Coloma	14	6	6	2	22	13	+9	24 (Note: FC Santa Coloma ahead on overall goal difference)	Qualification for the Championship round
3	Sant Julià	14	7	3	4	27	20	+7	24	Qualification for the Championship round
4	Atlètic Club d'Escaldes	14	6	5	3	25	12	+13	23	Qualification for the Championship round
5	Engordany	14	5	7	2	25	16	+9	22	Qualification for the Relegation round
6	UE Santa Coloma	14	6	2	6	19	15	+4	20	Qualification for the Relegation round
7	Penya Encarnada	14	2	1	11	10	47	−37	7 (Note: Head-to-head points: Penya Encarnada 6, Carroi 0)	Qualification for the Relegation round
8	Carroi	14	2	1	11	8	28	−20	7	Qualification for the Relegation round

Source: FAF Soccerway.com
Rules for classification: 1) Points; 2) Head-to-head points; 3) Head-to-head goal difference; 4) Head-to-head goals scored; 5) Goal difference; 6) Goals scored.

=== Results ===
The eight clubs will play each other twice for fourteen matches each in the regular season.

Home \ Away	ACE	CAR	ENG	INT	PEN	SJU	SFC	SUE
Atlètic Club d'Escaldes		2–1	3–3	2–1	3–0	1–1	0–2	0–0
Carroi	0–2		0–2	2–0	0–3	0–3	0–3	1–3
Engordany	1–1	1–1		0–2	5–0	3–0	2–2	2–0
Inter Club d'Escaldes	0–0	2–0	0–0		6–0	3–1	1–1	0–0
Penya Encarnada	0–8	3–0	1–1	0–1		0–3	0–2	1–2
Sant Julià	2–1	2–1	1–2	0–2	6–2		1–1	3–1
FC Santa Coloma	0–2	1–2	2–2	1–1	3–0	2–2		1–0
UE Santa Coloma	1–0	1–0	3–1	0–3	7–0	1–2	0–1	

Source: Soccerway.com
Legend: Blue = home team win; Yellow = draw; Red = away team win.

== Championship and relegation rounds ==
Regular season records are carried over to championship and relegation rounds.

=== Championship round ===
Pos	Team	Pld	W	D	L	GF	GA	GD	Pts	Qualification	INT	SJU	SFC	ACE
1	Inter Club d'Escaldes (C)	20	11	6	3	34	11	+23	39	Qualification for the Champions League preliminary round		1–0	1–1	4–0
2	Sant Julià	20	10	4	6	33	24	+9	34	Qualification for the Europa Conference League first qualifying round (Note: Since the winners of the 2021 Copa Constitució, Sant Julià, qualified for the Europa Conference League based on league position, their place was transferred to the third-placed team.)	1–0		2–0	2–2
3	FC Santa Coloma	20	8	8	4	28	19	+9	32	Qualification for the Europa Conference League first qualifying round	1–2	1–0		0–0
4	Atlètic Club d'Escaldes	20	6	7	7	29	26	+3	25		1–4	0–1	1–3	

Source: FAF soccerway.com
Legend: Blue = home team win; Yellow = draw; Red = away team win.
Rules for classification: 1) Points; 2) Head-to-head points; 3) Head-to-head goal difference; 4) Head-to-head goals scored; 5) Goal difference; 6) Goals scored.
(C) Champions

=== Relegation round ===
Pos	Team	Pld	W	D	L	GF	GA	GD	Pts	Relegation	ENG	SUE	CAR	PEN
5	Engordany	20	8	9	3	43	30	+13	33			2–5	1–1	4–3
6	UE Santa Coloma	20	9	3	8	44	27	+17	30		4–6		1–1	9–0
7	Carroi (O)	20	5	4	11	20	34	−14	19	Qualification for the relegation play-offs	1–1	3–2		3–0
8	Penya Encarnada (R)	20	2	1	17	14	74	−60	7	Relegation to the Segona Divisió	0–4	0–4	1–3	

Source: FAF soccerway
Legend: Blue = home team win; Yellow = draw; Red = away team win.
Rules for classification: 1) Points; 2) Head-to-head points; 3) Head-to-head goal difference; 4) Head-to-head goals scored; 5) Goal difference; 6) Goals scored.
(O) Play-off winners; (R) Relegated

== Primera Divisió play-offs ==
The seventh-placed team (third-placed in the relegation round) from the 2020–21 Primera Divisió and the runners-up from the 2020–21 Segona Divisió played in a two-legged play-off for one place in the 2021–22 Primera Divisió.

29 May 2021	La Massana	0–2	Carroi
20:30

2 June 2021	Carroi	3–1 (5–1 agg.)	La Massana
20:30

== Top scorers ==
As of matches played 11 April 2021

Rank	Player	Club	Goals
1	(France) Guillaume Lopez	Engordany	11
2	(Spain) Youssef Ezzejjari	Carroi	7
2	(The Gambia) Bacari	Sant Julià	7
2	(Spain) Genís Soldevila	Atlètic Club d'Escaldes	7
5	(Uruguay) Gastón Machado	Atlètic Club d'Escaldes	5
5	(Spain) Juanma Torres	FC Santa Coloma	5
7	(Spain) Gerard Artigas	Inter Club d'Escaldes	4
7	(Andorra) Àlex Martínez	FC Santa Coloma	4
7	(Spain) Joel Paredes	UE Santa Coloma	4
7	(Andorra) Aarón Sánchez	Engordany	4
7	(Spain) David Virgili	Sant Julià	4

== See also ==
- 2020–21 Segona Divisió
- Copa Constitució
