= Cláudio Correa =

Paraguayan footballer (born 1993)

Personal information
- Full name: Cláudio César Correa Cañiza
- Date of birth: 3 May 1993 (age 33)
- Place of birth: Asunción, Paraguay
- Height: 1.81 m (5 ft 11 in)
- Position: Striker

Team information
- Current team: Rubio Ñu

Youth career
- 2010–2011: Sportivo Luqueño

Senior career*
Years	Team	Apps	(Gls)
2010–2011	Sportivo Luqueño	16	(1)
2012	Rubio Ñu	17	(3)
2012–2014	Benfica B	16	(2)
2013	→ Sportivo Luqueño (loan)	17	(3)
2014	→ Rubio Ñu (loan)	22	(7)
2014–2017	Sol de América	27	(7)
2015	→ Rubio Ñu (loan)	22	(6)
2015–2016	→ Guaraní (loan)	28	(10)
2016	→ Aldosivi (loan)	7	(0)
2017	Rubio Ñu	20	(4)
2018	Sol de América	13	(0)
2018–2019	Independiente	21	(4)
2019	→ Pelotas (loan)	6	(0)
2019–	Rubio Ñu	2	(1)

International career
2011	Paraguay U20	6	(1)
- * Club domestic league appearances and goals as of 22:44, 31 May 2019 (UTC)

Cláudio César Correa Cañiza (born 3 May 1993) is a Paraguayan professional footballer who plays as a striker for Rubio Ñu.

== Club career ==
Born in Asunción, Correa is a youth prospect of Sportivo Luqueño, where he stayed for just one year, before he moved to Club Rubio Ñu. On 11 July 2012, the 19-year-old moved to Benfica from Club Rubio Ñu on a five-year deal for an undisclosed fee. He was assigned to the B-team and made his debut on 11 August 2012, in a 2012–13 Segunda Liga match against Braga B, replacing Djaniny in the 72 minute. The following matches, he asserted himself in the starting lineup, but only scored two goals in more than six months.

In February 2013, Correa returned to Sportivo Luqueño, on loan until the end of the season, scoring three goals in 17 league games. For the following season, Correa was loaned out for a second time, re-joining Rubio Ñu, with Benfica disclosing on 30 May 2014 that Correa's and Derlis González's economic rights had been sold to Master International FZC for €1.7 million.

On 22 July 2014, he joined Club Sol de América, where he played the first part of the season, before joining Rubio Ñu on loan for a third spell at the club for the 2015 Apertura. On 13 June 2015, Correa moved to Guaraní on loan, where he scored 10 goals in total, four in 2015 Clausura and six in the 2016 Apertura. After 2 1/2 seasons in Paraguayan football, in June 2016 Correa emigrated again, this time on a loan deal to Argentinian club Aldosivi.

In July 2018, Correa joined Independiente. On 15 February 2019, he was loaned out to Brazilian club Pelotas. In April 2019, he returned to Rubio Ñu.

== International career ==
Correa was in the squad for the 2011 South American Youth Championship where he played in the 3 games and scored once.

On 28 January 2011, after a match against Colombia U20, Correa assaulted the assistant referee for alleged errors during the match. He was suspended 1 year from March 2011 to March 2012 from internacional matches. However, since Paraguay U20 didn't qualify for 2011 FIFA U-20 World Cup or the 2012 Summer Olympics, neither Club Rubio Ñu qualify for CONMEBOL competitions, the suspension had no practical effect.
