= 2019–20 Segona Divisió =

Segona Divisió
- Season: 2019–20
- Champions: Penya Encarnada
- Promoted: Penya Encarnada
- Matches: 79
- Goals: 395 (5 per match)

The 2019–20 Segona Divisió, also known as Lliga UNIDA, was the 21st season of second-tier football in Andorra. The season began on 21 September 2019 and ended on 11 July 2020.

On 5 May, the clubs and the federation agreed on how to finish the season. The two teams which remained mathematically able to qualify for promotion played each other twice to determine final places in the league. On 1 July, this was confirmed.

== Teams ==
At the end of the previous season, Atlètic Club d'Escaldes and Carroi were promoted to the Primera Divisió. These two teams were replaced in the Segona Divisió by Lusitanos and Encamp who were relegated from the Primera Divisió.

== League table ==
| Pos | Team | Pld | W | D | L | GF | GA | GD | Pts | Promotion or qualification |
|---|---|---|---|---|---|---|---|---|---|---|
| 1 | Penya Encarnada (C, P) | 17 | 16 | 1 | 0 | 56 | 8 | +48 | 49 | Promotion to Primera Divisió |
| 2 | La Massana | 17 | 15 | 0 | 2 | 86 | 19 | +67 | 45 | Qualification for the relegation play-offs |
| 3 | Encamp | 16 | 8 | 3 | 5 | 42 | 36 | +6 | 27 | |
| 4 | Rànger's | 15 | 8 | 0 | 7 | 31 | 37 | −6 | 24 | |
| 5 | Lusitanos (Note: Lusitanos were deducted 3 points.) | 15 | 7 | 2 | 6 | 48 | 22 | +26 | 20 | |
| 6 | Inter Club d'Escaldes B | 16 | 6 | 2 | 8 | 28 | 36 | −8 | 20 | |
| 7 | UE Santa Coloma B | 15 | 6 | 1 | 8 | 39 | 49 | −10 | 19 | |
| 8 | Atlètic Amèrica | 16 | 3 | 0 | 13 | 30 | 64 | −34 | 9 | |
| 9 | Carroi B (Note: Carroi B were deducted 3 points.) | 16 | 3 | 1 | 12 | 25 | 53 | −28 | 7 | |
| 10 | UE Extremenya (Note: UE Extremenya were deducted 3 points.) | 15 | 2 | 0 | 13 | 10 | 71 | −61 | 3 | |

Source: FAF soccerway.com
Rules for classification: 1) points; 2) head-to-head points; 3) head-to-head goal difference; 4) head-to-head goals scored; 5) goal difference; 6) goals scored
(C) Champions; (P) Promoted

== Results ==
| Home \ Away | ATL | CAR | ENC | EXT | INT | MAS | LUS | PEN | RAN | SUE |
|---|---|---|---|---|---|---|---|---|---|---|
| Atlètic Amèrica | | 2–4 | 3–6 | 2–0 | 1–2 | 1–8 | | 1–2 | 0–4 | 2–6 |
| Carroi B | | | 0–3 | 0–2 | 5–2 | 0–1 | 0–10 | 1–6 | 0–1 | 3–4 |
| Encamp | 3–1 | 4–0 | | | 4–1 | 2–7 | 2–2 | 1–4 | 2–1 | 3–2 |
| UE Extremenya | 0–9 | 1–7 | 0–3 | | 0–6 | 0–9 | 4–3 | 0–3 | 1–5 | |
| Inter Club d'Escaldes B | 3–2 | 1–1 | 3–3 | 3–1 | | | 3–2 | 0–1 | 1–2 | 2–1 |
| La Massana | 4–0 | 8–1 | 4–1 | 8–0 | 4–1 | | 3–0 | 1–2 | 7–1 | 8–2 |
| Lusitanos | 9–0 | 1–0 | | 3–1 | 3–0 | 1–2 | | 1–3 | 0–3 | 8–1 |
| Penya Encarnada | 7–1 | | 2–0 | 3–0 | 4–0 | 2–1 | 0–0 | | 6–0 | 3–0 |
| Ràngers | 3–4 | 4–2 | 3–2 | | | 1–4 | 0–5 | 0–3 | | 3–0 |
| UE Santa Coloma B | 3–1 | 3–1 | 3–3 | 7–0 | 2–0 | 4–7 | | 1–5 | | |

Source: FAF
Legend: Blue = home team win; Yellow = draw; Red = away team win.
For upcoming matches, an "a" indicates there is an article about the rivalry between the two participants.

== Primera Divisió play-offs ==
The seventh-placed team (third-placed in the relegation round) from the 2019–20 Primera Divisió and the runners-up from the 2019–20 Segona Divisió, played a relegation play-off for a place in the 2020–21 Primera Divisió. A two-legged play-off was supposed to be held on 25 and 28 July 2020, but was postponed due to a positive COVID-19 case within La Massana. As a result, the play-off was changed to a single match.

1 August 2020
10:00

| Carroi | 4–1 | La Massana |
|---|---|---|
| Barroso 37', 66'; Rodas 83'; Martins 86' (pen.) | | Fernandez 80' |

Centre d'Entrenament de la FAF, Santa Coloma

== See also ==
- 2019–20 Primera Divisió
- 2020 Copa Constitució
