= 2020–21 Segona Divisió =

Segona Divisió
- Season: 2020–21
- Dates: 29 November 2020 - 23 May 2021
- Champions: Ordino
- Promoted: Ordino
- Matches: 68
- Goals: 226 (3.32 per match)
- Biggest home win: Ordino 5–0 UE Santa Coloma B (28 February 2021)
- Biggest away win: Engordany B 2–11 Ordino (11 April 2021)
- Highest scoring: Engordany B 2–11 Ordino (11 April 2021)
- Longest winning run: 8 matches La Massana (29 November 2020-13 February 2021)
- Longest unbeaten run: 18 matches Ordino (29 November 2020-28 February 2021)
- Longest winless run: 9 matches Rànger's (20 December 2020-20 March 2021)
- Longest losing run: 7 matches Rànger's (20 December 2020-27 February 2021)

The 2020–21 Segona Divisió, also known as Lliga UNIDA, was the 22nd season of second-tier football in Andorra. The season was scheduled to begin on 25 October 2020. Due to the COVID-19 pandemic in Andorra, the season was delayed to potentially begin on 8 November 2020. Eventually, the season began on 29 November 2020.

== Teams ==
Penya Encarnada won the league the previous season, and were promoted to the Primera Divisió. Ordino were relegated from the Primera Divisió and joined the Segona Divisió. Jenlai returned to the league after not participating the previous season.

== League table ==
Pos	Team	Pld	W	D	L	GF	GA	GD	Pts	Qualification
1	La Massana	14	11	2	1	29	9	+20	35	Advance to play-off round
2	Ordino	14	11	2	1	42	10	+32	35	Advance to play-off round
3	Encamp	14	8	2	4	24	15	+9	26	Advance to play-off round
4	Jenlai	14	6	0	8	27	30	−3	18	Advance to play-off round
5	Atlètic Amèrica	14	5	1	8	11	19	−8	16	
6	UE Santa Coloma B	14	4	2	8	18	35	−17	14	
7	Engordany B	14	3	1	10	15	36	−21	10	
8	Rànger's	14	2	2	10	19	31	−12	8	

Source: FAF Soccerway.com
Rules for classification: 1) points; 2) head-to-head points; 3) head-to-head goal difference; 4) head-to-head goals scored; 5) goal difference; 6) goals scored

== Results ==
Home \ Away	ATL	ENC	ENG	JEN	MAS	ORD	RAN	SUE
Atlètic Amèrica		0–3	2–1	1–2	1–3	0–3	1–1	1–0
Encamp	2–0		2–1	4–1	2–3	0–1	2–0	1–1
Engordany B	1–0	0–2		1–4	1–1	2–11	2–0	0–3
Jenlai	0–1	3–1	0–3		1–3	1–2	0–4	4–2
La Massana	1–0	0–1	3–0	2–0		0–0	2–1	3–0
Ordino	1–0	3–1	2–0	3–1	1–2		2–2	5–0
Rànger's	1–2	1–2	3–2	1–6	1–2	1–2		1–2
UE Santa Coloma B	0–2	1–1	3–1	2–4	0–4	0–6	4–2	

Source: Soccerway.com
Legend: Blue = home team win; Yellow = draw; Red = away team win.
For upcoming matches, an "a" indicates there is an article about the rivalry between the two participants.

== Play–off round ==
Pos	Team	Pld	W	D	L	GF	GA	GD	Pts	Promotion or qualification
1	Ordino (C, P)	20	15	4	1	57	15	+42	49	Promotion to Primera Divisió
2	La Massana	20	15	3	2	42	14	+28	48	Qualification to play-offs
3	Encamp	20	10	2	8	32	26	+6	32	
4	Jenlai	20	6	1	13	33	51	−18	19	

Source: FAF soccerway.com
Rules for classification: 1) points; 2) head-to-head points; 3) head-to-head goal difference; 4) head-to-head goals scored; 5) goal difference; 6) goals scored
(C) Champions; (P) Promoted

=== Results ===
Home \ Away	ENC	JEN	MAS	ORD
Encamp		4–2	1–4	0–1
Jenlai	0–2		1–5	0–5
La Massana	1–0	2–0		0–0
Ordino	3–0	3–3	3–1	

Source: soccerway.com
Legend: Blue = home team win; Yellow = draw; Red = away team win.
For upcoming matches, an "a" indicates there is an article about the rivalry between the two participants.

== Primera Divisió play-offs ==
The seventh-placed team (third-placed in the relegation round) from the 2020–21 Primera Divisió and the runners-up from the 2020–21 Segona Divisió played in a two-legged play-off for one place in the 2021–22 Primera Divisió.

29 May 2021	La Massana	0–2	Carroi
20:30

2 June 2021	Carroi	3–1 (5–1 agg.)	La Massana
20:30

== See also ==
- 2020–21 Primera Divisió
- 2021 Copa Constitució
