= Leandro Gareca =

Bolivian footballer (born 1991)

Personal information
- Full name: Leandro Gareca Cardona
- Date of birth: 23 June 1991 (age 35)
- Place of birth: Monteagudo, Bolivia
- Height: 1.74 m (5 ft 9 in)
- Position: Left-back

Team information
- Current team: Universitario de Sucre
- Number: 27

Youth career
- Universitario de Sucre

Senior career*
Years	Team	Apps	(Gls)
2010–2012	Universitario de Sucre	1	(0)
2011	→ Figueirense (loan)	0	(0)
2012–	Independiente CG	1	(0)
2013	Universitario de Sucre	14	(0)

International career^{‡}
2011–	Bolivia U20	1	(0)
- * Club domestic league appearances and goals as of 25 June 2012 ‡ National team caps and goals as of 25 June 2012

Leandro Gareca Cardona (born 23 June 1991) is a Bolivian footballer who currently plays for Universitario de Sucre.

== Club career ==
Gareca began his career on Universitario de Sucre, but appeared only in the bench, on 28 November 2010, against Real Mamoré.

In February of the following year, the Brazilian side Figueirense brought Gareca in a one-year loan. However, the player was not registered, and failed to make a single appearance for Figueira.

In January 2012 Gareca moved to Paraguay, and signed a contract with Independiente Campo Grande.
