= Osnar Noronha =

Peruvian footballer (born 1991)

Personal information
- Full name: Osnar Noronha Montani
- Date of birth: 17 December 1991 (age 34)
- Place of birth: Iquitos, Peru
- Height: 1.81 m (5 ft 11 in)
- Position: Forward

Team information
- Current team: Cienciano
- Number: 17

Youth career
- 2007-2008: Los Tigres
- 2009: Colegio Nacional Iquitos

Senior career*
Years	Team	Apps	(Gls)
2009–2011	Colegio Nacional Iquitos	42	(6)
2011	→ Juan Aurich (loan)	3	(0)
2012–2014	Juan Aurich	54	(9)
2012	→ José Gálvez (loan)	26	(4)
2015	Alianza Lima	23	(1)
2016–2017	Ayacucho	29	(1)
2017	Comerciantes Unidos	7	(0)
2017–2021	Carlos A. Mannucci	121	(48)
2022-2024	Club Deportivo Universidad César Vallejo	98	(17)
2025-	Cienciano	23	(3)

International career
2010	Peru U20		
2012	Peru	1	(0)
- * Club domestic league appearances and goals as of 30 December 2025

Osnar Noronha Montani (born 17 December 1991) is a Peruvian footballer currently playing for Cienciano in the Peruvian Primera División, as a forward.

== Club career ==
=== Colegio Nacional Iquitos ===
Noronha made his Torneo Descentralizado debut for CNI on 6 December 2009 away to Elías Aguirre Stadium against Juan Aurich. In the 2010 season on September 29, Osnar scored his first professional goal in a 2-1 win against Total Chalaco.

=== Juan Aurich ===
On 11 July 2011 it was announced that Noronha would join Juan Aurich on a loan for the rest of the 2011 season. He arrived to the Chiclayo based club alongside notable players such as Roberto Merino and Roberto Guizasola in order to strengthen the team ahead of the final push for the 2011 league title. He made his debut for Juan Aurich on 7 August 2011 in an away league match against Union Comercio, which finished in a 1-1 draw. He started the match from the beginning and was later substituted off for Pedro Ascoy at the start of the second half.

== International career ==
He played for the Peru U20 side in the 2011 South American Youth Championship.

== Honours ==
=== Club ===
Juan Aurich

- Torneo Descentralizado (1): 2011
