= Enric Pi =

Spanish footballer

Personal information
- Full name: Enric Pi Solà
- Date of birth: 20 May 1983 (age 43)
- Place of birth: Granollers, Spain
- Height: 1.89 m (6 ft 2 in)
- Position: Winger

Youth career
- 1991–2002: Granollers

Senior career*
Years	Team	Apps	(Gls)
2000–2002	Granollers	24	(8)
2002–2005	Mallorca B	100	(21)
2005	Cartagena	2	(0)
2005–2006	Sant Andreu	14	(0)
2006–2007	Lanzarote	9	(1)
2007	Premià	19	(4)
2007–2008	Europa	35	(12)
2008–2009	Reus	32	(6)
2009–2011	Teruel	67	(15)
2011–2015	Llagostera	114	(23)
2016–2017	Badalona	20	(1)
2017–2018	Granollers	12	(0)
2018–2019	Sant Julià	40	(14)
2019–2022	Santa Coloma	39	(7)
- * Club domestic league appearances and goals

Enric Pi Solà (born 20 May 1983) is a Spanish former professional footballer who played as a left winger.

== Club career ==
Born in Granollers, Barcelona, Catalonia, Pi made his senior debut with lowly EC Granollers on 11 March 2001, in the regional leagues. In the 2002 summer he moved to RCD Mallorca's reserves in Segunda División B. He appeared regularly for the Balearics, being also called up with the main squad in a 1–2 La Liga away loss against Racing de Santander, but remaining unused.

Pi continued to appear in the third level but also in Tercera División in the following years, representing FC Cartagena, UE Sant Andreu, UD Lanzarote, CE Premià, CE Europa, CF Reus Deportiu, CD Teruel and UE Llagostera. With the latter he achieved a promotion to Segunda División in the end of the 2013–14 campaign, appearing in 35 matches and scoring a career-best 12 goals.

On 10 September 2014, aged 31, Pi played his first match as a professional, starting in a 0–2 away loss against Real Betis for the season's Copa del Rey.
