= Xisco Pires =

Andorran footballer (born 1998)

Personal information
- Full name: Francisco Manuel Pires Costa
- Date of birth: 25 January 1998 (age 28)
- Place of birth: Viana do Castelo, Portugal
- Height: 1.94 m (6 ft 4 in)
- Position: Goalkeeper

Team information
- Current team: Esperança
- Number: 1

Youth career
- 2013–2017: FC Andorra

Senior career*
Years	Team	Apps	(Gls)
2017–2019	FC Andorra	9	(0)
2019–2020	UE Santa Coloma	13	(0)
2020–2021	Engordany	8	(0)
2021–2022	Manchego	11	(0)
2022–2023	Vianense	4	(0)
2023–2024	La Solana	22	(0)
2024–2026	Ordino	37	(0)
2026–	Esperança	0	(0)

International career^{‡}
2014	Andorra U17	3	(0)
2015–2016	Andorra U19	5	(0)
2017–2020	Andorra U21	6	(0)
2020–	Andorra	5	(0)
- * Club domestic league appearances and goals as of 16 May 2026 ‡ National team caps and goals as of 17 November 2025

Francisco Manuel "Xisco" Pires Costa (born 25 January 1998) is an Andorran footballer who plays as a goalkeeper for Andorran club CF Esperança d'Andorra and the Andorra national team.

== Career ==
Pires made his international debut for Andorra on 7 October 2020 in a friendly match against Cape Verde, which finished as a 1–2 home loss.

== Career statistics ==
=== International ===
As of 17 November 2025

Andorra
Year	Apps	Goals
2020	1	0
2021	1	0
2024	2	0
2025	1	0
Total	5	0
