= Ramsés Bustos =

Chilean footballer (born 1991)

Personal information
- Full name: Ramsés Maximiliano Bustos Guerrero
- Date of birth: 13 October 1991 (age 35)
- Place of birth: Santiago, Chile
- Height: 1.71 m (5 ft 7 in)
- Position: Striker

Youth career
- 2003–2009: Unión Española

Senior career*
Years	Team	Apps	(Gls)
2009–2014	Unión Española	28	(2)
2012–2014	Unión Española B	27	(17)
2012	→ Barnechea (loan)	3	(0)
2013	→ Buriram United (loan)	3	(1)
2015	Deportes La Serena	14	(2)
2015	Deportes Pintana	9	(3)
2016	Deportes Copiapó	3	(0)
2016–2017	Deportes Valdivia	12	(0)
2017	Nong Khai	–	(–)
2017	Nongbua Pitchaya	12	(1)
2017	Super Power Samut Prakan	15	(2)
2018	Jumpasri United	–	(–)
Total		126	(28)

International career
2009	Chile U18		
2011	Chile U20	5	(1)
- * Club domestic league appearances and goals

Ramsés Maximiliano Bustos Guerrero (born 13 October 1991) is a Chilean former professional footballer who played as a striker.

== Club career ==
A product of Unión Española youth system, Bustos played for many clubs in Chile and outside of his country of birth, he played for clubs in Thailand. In 2013 he joined Buriram United, winning the 2013 Thai Premier League and the 2013 Kor Royal Cup. In 2017 he returned to the country after having played in Chile, to join Nongbua Pitchaya and next Super Power Samut Prakan. After legal issues of Super Power, renamed Jumpasri United in 2018, he returned to Chile in 2019.

== International career ==
Bustos took part of the Chile squad at under-18 level at the 2009 Youth Olympic Games, where the team won the silver medal, alongside players such as Yashir Pinto, José Luis Silva, Juan Carlos Espinoza, Johanns Dulcien, among others.

In 2011, he represented Chile U20 at the South American Championship.

== Personal life ==
He is nicknamed El Faraón del Gol (The Pharaoh of the Goal) due to his first name Ramsés (Ramesses in English).

== Honours ==
Buriram United

- Thai Premier League: 2013
- Kor Royal Cup: 2013
