= Miguel Quiroga =

Bolivian footballer (born 1991)

Personal information
- Full name: Miguel Alejandro Quiroga Castillo
- Date of birth: 15 September 1991 (age 35)
- Place of birth: La Paz, Bolivia
- Height: 1.75 m (5 ft 9 in)
- Position: Midfielder

Team information
- Current team: Aurora
- Number: 20

Senior career*
Years	Team	Apps	(Gls)
2010–2018	The Strongest	36	(1)
2015–2016	→ Ciclón (loan)	26	(1)
2018–2022	Nacional Potosí	114	(6)
2022–	Aurora	36	(1)
- * Club domestic league appearances and goals as of 9 December 2022

Miguel Alejandro Quiroga Castillo (born 15 September 1991) is a Bolivian footballer who plays for Club Aurora in the Bolivian Primera División.

== Club career ==
=== The Strongest ===
A graduate of The Strongest's youth academy, Quiroga made his senior debut for the club on 31 October 2010 in a 3–1 defeat to C.D. Jorge Wilstermann. In January 2015, he scored his first competitive goal for the club, scoring in a 5–0 victory over Universitario de Pando. After featuring sparingly for the first team, he was loaned out to Ciclón ahead of the 2015–16 season.

=== Nacional Potosí ===
In January 2018, Quiroga joined Nacional Potosí, initially agreeing on a one-year loan deal. This was eventually extended to a full transfer. He made his professional debut for the club on 27 January 2018 in a 2–1 victory over San José. During the 2020 season, he served as club captain.

=== Club Aurora ===
After four years with Nacional Potosí, Quiroga moved to Club Aurora. Expressing confidence in the team's chances, Quiroga stated that his objective was to win the league title in 2022. He made his debut in the club's opening match of the season, a 0–0 draw against Guabirá.

== International career ==
In May 2018, Quiroga was called up to the Bolivia national football team for a friendly match against the United States. However, he would not appear during the match.

== Career statistics ==
=== Club ===
As of match played 20 October 2022

Appearances and goals by club, season and competition
Club	Season	League			Cup		Continental		Other		Total	
Club	Season	Division	Apps	Goals	Apps	Goals	Apps	Goals	Apps	Goals	Apps	Goals
The Strongest	2010	Bolivian Primera División	6	0	—		—		—		6	0
The Strongest	2011	Bolivian Primera División	7	0	—		—		—		7	0
The Strongest	2011–12	Bolivian Primera División	0	0	—		—		—		0	0
The Strongest	2012–13	Bolivian Primera División	1	0	—		—		—		1	0
The Strongest	2014–15	Bolivian Primera División	13	1	—		—		—		13	1
The Strongest	2016–17	Bolivian Primera División	9	0	—		—		—		9	0
The Strongest	Total		36	1	—		—		—		36	1
Ciclón (loan)	2015–16	Bolivian Primera División	26	1	—		—		—		26	1
Nacional Potosí	2018	Bolivian Primera División	27	1	—		1 (Note: Appearance(s) in the Copa Sudamericana)	0	1 (Note: Appearance in the Bolivian Primera División Apertura Championship Playoffs quarterfinals)	0	29	1
Nacional Potosí	2019	Bolivian Primera División	42	2	—		2	0	—		44	2
Nacional Potosí	2020	Bolivian Primera División	20	1	—		2	0	—		22	1
Nacional Potosí	2021	Bolivian Primera División	25	2	—		2	0	—		27	2
Nacional Potosí	Total		114	6	—		7	0	1	0	122	6
Aurora	2022	Bolivian Primera División	36	1	—		—		—		36	1
Career total			212	9	—		7	0	1	0	220	9
