= Claudio Mosca =

Argentine footballer

Personal information
- Full name: Claudio Ezequiel Mosca
- Date of birth: April 2, 1991 (age 35)
- Place of birth: Bernal, Argentina
- Height: 1.80 m (5 ft 11 in)
- Position: Midfielder

Team information
- Current team: Cipolletti

Youth career
- Arsenal de Sarandí

Senior career*
Years	Team	Apps	(Gls)
2009–2014	Arsenal de Sarandí	46	(5)
2012–2013	→ Nueva Chicago (loan)	12	(0)
2013–2014	→ Santiago Morning (loan)		
2014–2015	Universitario de Sucre	25	(2)
2015–2017	Guillermo Brown	89	(5)
2017–2019	San Martín SJ	48	(1)
2019–2021	San Martín Tucumán	27	(0)
2021	San Luis	11	(0)
2021–2024	Ferro Carril Oeste	99	(7)
2025	San Miguel	19	(0)
2026–	Cipolletti		

International career
2011	Argentina U20	5	(1)
- * Club domestic league appearances and goals as of 15:19, 20 March 2026 (UTC)

Claudio Ezequiel Mosca (born April 2, 1991, in Bernal, Argentina) is an Argentine footballer who plays as a midfielder for Cipolletti in the Torneo Federal A of Argentina.

== Career ==
Cláudio Mosca debuted with Arsenal de Sarandí in 2009, winning the league title in 2012 and playing in the Copa Libertadores and Copa Argentina. In 2013, he went on loan to Nueva Chicago and in 2014, he went on loan to Santiago Morning. Coaches Sergio Batista and Marcelo Trobbiani incorporated him into the Argentina national under-20 football team between 2010 and 2011. In 2014, he played in international competitions with Universitario de Sucre (Bolivia). He then joined Guillermo Brown for the season 2015 Primera B Nacional. Cláudio Mosca currently plays for Cipolletti in 2026.

== Honours ==
Season	Club	Title
2011-2012 (C)	Arsenal de Sarandí	Primera División
