= Alejandro Márquez =

Chilean footballer (born 1991)

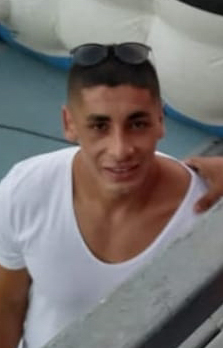

Personal information
- Full name: Alejandro Samuel Márquez Pérez
- Date of birth: 31 October 1991 (age 35)
- Place of birth: Loncoche, Chile
- Height: 1.73 m (5 ft 8 in)
- Position: Defensive midfielder

Team information
- Current team: Rangers
- Number: 8

Youth career
- Unión Temuco

Senior career*
Years	Team	Apps	(Gls)
2010–2013	Unión Temuco	62	(0)
2011	→ Universidad de Chile (loan)	1	(0)
2013–2016	Deportes Temuco	34	(0)
2014–2015	→ Palestino (loan)	25	(1)
2015–2016	→ O'Higgins (loan)	32	(1)
2016–2021	O'Higgins	93	(7)
2019	→ Paraná (loan)	2	(0)
2022–2023	Deportes Temuco	33	(3)
2024	Rangers	31	(5)
2025	Cobresal	16	(0)
2026–	Rangers	0	(0)

International career
2011	Chile U20	7	(2)
- * Club domestic league appearances and goals as of 19 December 2025

Alejandro Samuel Márquez Pérez (born 31 October 1991) is a Chilean professional footballer who plays as a defensive midfielder for Rangers de Talca.

== Club career ==
On 12 September 2010, Márquez made his Unión Temuco debut against Lota Schwager. He with the pass of time was a frequently in Temuco's squad, consecrating him at the team. On 20 November 2011 he officially debuted with Universidad de Chile in a match against Universidad Católica for the 2011 Torneo Clausura. For the 2012 season he returned to Unión Temuco, after being on loan 6 months at Universidad de Chile.

On 11 July 2015, he joined in O'Higgins in a loan for 1 year, starting for the 2015–16 season.

For the 2024 season, Márquez signed with Rangers de Talca. The next season, he switched to Cobresal and returned to Rangers in 2026.

== International career ==
In January 2011, it was revelated that the coach César Vaccia selected Márquez for the South American Championship squad that was going to travel to Peru. He debuted against host team Peru and played 90 minutes. On 24 January, he scored his first international goal against Argentina in a 3–1 defeat. In a decisive game against Venezuela, he scored his second goal for Chile in the last match of the group stage, now in a 3–1 victory, thus establishing as the goalscorer of his team in the group stage.

== Honours ==
Universidad de Chile

- Primera División de Chile (1): 2011 Clausura
- Copa Sudamericana (1): 2011
