= Diego Viera (Paraguayan footballer) =

Paraguayan football player (born 1991)

Personal information
- Full name: Diego Francisco Viera Ruiz Díaz
- Date of birth: 30 April 1991 (age 35)
- Place of birth: Capiatá, Paraguay
- Height: 1.86 m (6 ft 1 in)
- Position: Centre back

Team information
- Current team: Libertad
- Number: 5

Senior career*
Years	Team	Apps	(Gls)
2010–2011	Cerro Porteño	9	(0)
2011	Rubio Ñu	1	(0)
2012	Tacuary	44	(3)
2013	Sportivo Luqueño	31	(2)
2014	Cerro Porteño	5	(0)
2015–2019	Godoy Cruz	106	(3)
2019–	Libertad	198	(8)
- * Club domestic league appearances and goals as of 12 August 2025

Diego Francisco Viera Ruiz Díaz (Note: In this Spanish name, the first or paternal surname is Viera and the second or maternal family name is Ruiz Díaz.) (born 30 April 1991), known as Diego Viera, is a Paraguayan footballer currently playing for Club Libertad of the Paraguayan Primera División.
