= Ángel Ojeda =

Peruvian footballer (born 1992)

Personal information
- Full name: Ángel Ojeda Allauca
- Date of birth: 11 August 1992 (age 34)
- Place of birth: Callao, Peru
- Height: 1.72 m (5 ft 8 in)
- Position: Midfielder

Team information
- Current team: UTC
- Number: 8

Senior career*
Years	Team	Apps	(Gls)
2010–2013	Melgar	102	(2)
2014	Los Caimanes	22	(1)
2015–2018	Unión Comercio	130	(3)
2019–2022	Binacional	77	(7)
2022–2023	Cienciano	22	(1)
2024–	UTC	26	(1)
- * Club domestic league appearances and goals as of 2 November 2024

Ángel Ojeda Allauca (born 11 August 1992 in Callao, Peru) is a Peruvian footballer, who plays as a midfielder for UTC in the Liga 1.

== Club career ==
Ojeda made his debut in the Torneo Descentralizado on 15 May 2010 coming on as a late substitute for Nórbil Romero in the 2–0 away loss to Sport Boys. Manager Carlos Manta then allowed him to make his home debut as a starter the following round, but his side fell 1–4 against Universidad San Martín. Ojeda finished his debut season with 12 league appearances.
