= José Martínez (footballer, born 1991) =

Chilean footballer

José Martinez
Personal information
- Full name: José Víctor Martínez Díaz
- Date of birth: 18 March 1991 (age 35)
- Place of birth: Curicó, Chile
- Height: 1.75 m (5 ft 9 in)
- Position: Defender

Team information
- Current team: Deportes Santa Cruz
- Number: 4

Youth career
- 2005–2010: Universidad Católica

Senior career*
| Years | Team | Apps | (Gls) |
| 2010–2012 | Universidad Católica | 9 | (0) |
| 2012 | → San Marcos (loan) | 27 | (0) |
| 2013–2014 | Coquimbo Unido | 24 | (1) |
| 2014–2015 | Everton | 12 | (0) |
| 2015–2016 | Puerto Montt | 17 | (3) |
| 2016–2017 | San Marcos | 39 | (2) |
| 2018 | Magallanes | 18 | (0) |
| 2019 | Unión San Felipe | 17 | (2) |
| 2020 | Barnechea | 6 | (0) |
| 2021– | Deportes Santa Cruz | 3 | (0) |

International career
| 2011 | Chile U20 | 7 | (1) |
| 2010 | Chile | 2 | (0) |
- * Club domestic league appearances and goals as of 16 May 2020

José Víctor Martínez Díaz (born 18 March 1991) is a Chilean footballer who currently plays for Deportes Santa Cruz.

== Honours ==
=== Club ===
Universidad Católica

- Primera División de Chile (1): 2010
- Copa Chile (1): 2011

San Marcos de Arica

- Primera B de Chile (1): 2012

Coquimbo Unido

- Primera B de Chile (1): 2014
