= Edson Montaño =

Ecuadorian footballer (born 1991)

Personal information
- Full name: Edson Eli Montaño Angulo
- Date of birth: 15 March 1991 (age 35)
- Place of birth: Guayaquil, Ecuador
- Height: 1.83 m (6 ft 0 in)
- Position: Forward

Team information
- Current team: Técnico Universitario

Youth career
- 2005–2006: LDU Guayaquil
- 2006: Barcelona SC
- 2006–2010: El Nacional

Senior career*
Years	Team	Apps	(Gls)
2009–2010	El Nacional	9	(1)
2010–2011	Gent	4	(0)
2012	Barcelona SC	4	(0)
2013	El Nacional	27	(8)
2014–2015	Barcelona SC	13	(1)
2014–2015	→ Newcastle Jets (loan)	27	(6)
2016–2020	Aucas	59	(35)
2016–2017	→ Clan Juvenil (loan)	19	(8)
2020–2022	Independiente del Valle	21	(4)
2021	→ Sarmiento (loan)	8	(0)
2021–2022	Orense	33	(5)
2023–	Técnico Universitario	0	(0)

International career
	Ecuador U-20	13	(5)
2011	Ecuador	4	(0)
- * Club domestic league appearances and goals as of 18:40, 5 February 2023 (UTC)

Edson Eli Montaño Angulo (born 15 March 1991) is an Ecuadorian footballer who plays as a forward for the Ecuador national team and C.D. Técnico Universitario.

== Club career ==
He had been playing throughout his youth at Barcelona and El Nacional. At the start of the 2010–11 season, he signed a three-year contract with the First Division-team KAA Gent.

Montaño's youth team, El Nacional, sold the 19-year-old attacker to KAA Gent at an unknown transfer price. The transfer gave KAA Gent, according to a press article of the team, the possibility to add a young promising player to the team. Montaño plays as leader of the Ecuadorian selection and has been playing the international contest of players younger than 20 years in Spain (el Torneo Internacional sub 20 de l'Alcúdia). On the ninth matchday, he was in the starting team in the game against STVV and by this, he made his début in the first team of KAA Gent.

In January 2012, Montaño returned to his native Ecuador to play for his old team Barcelona.

On 25 June 2014, Montaño signed for Australian A-League side Newcastle Jets for a year on loan. Montaño made his debut for the Jets on 11 October and was unable to help his side as they lost 1–0 to local rivals Central Coast Mariners. Montaño scored his first A-League goal in the Round 2 clash against Melbourne City, helping the Jet's to a 1–1 draw, courtesy of his emphatic finish. He retained his decent goal-scoring form scoring against the Mariners, Sydney, another against City, and an additional goal against the Roar in the culminating clash of the season. On 10 April, he scored against Melbourne Victory to give his side a 1–0 unforeseen win over the ladder leaders, Victory, a win that benumbed Victory supporters. This emphatic finish moved them off the bottom of the table.
