= FC Ordino =

Association football club in Andorra

Ordino
- Full name: Futbol Club Ordino
- Founded: 2010; 16 years ago
- Ground: Andorra Football Federation stadiums
- Chairman: David Forné
- Manager: Cristian Barea
- League: Primera Divisió
- 2025-26: Primera Divisió, 7th of 10
Home colours	Away colours

Futbol Club Ordino is an Andorran professional football club based in Ordino. Three-time winners of the Segona Divisió, the club currently plays in Primera Divisió.

== History ==
Founded in 2010 as a football academy, FC Ordino was admitted by the clubs of the league in 2012 and won their first 11 matches in the Segona Divisió. In May 2013, Ordino were promoted to the top division, after winning every game they played in the Segona Divisió. Argentine footballer Javier Saviola joined as an assistant coach in September 2016. In the 2010s the club reached two Andorran Cup semifinals, the first during the 2014–15 season, against Lusitans, and the second in 2016–17 season, against Sant Julià. In the 2016–17 regular season they were relegated to the second tier in the playout with a 3–5 on aggregate against Penya Encarnada d'Andorra. At the end of 2017–18 season, the team returned to the first tier after finishing 1st in Segona Divisió.

Although the club subsequently returned to the second division in 2020, they were promoted back to the top flight after winning the 2020–21 Segona Divisió, confirming their title with a 5–0 win against Jenlai in the last game of the season. The club reached the semi-finals of the Copa Constitució for the third time in 2023 but lost on penalties to Inter Club d'Escaldes. Xavi Carmona led the team in the first half of the 2024–25 season but Albert Gómez became manager of the club in December 2024.

== Current squad ==
As of 15 March 2026

Note: Flags indicate national team as defined under FIFA eligibility rules; some limited exceptions apply. Players may hold more than one non-FIFA nationality.

No.	Pos.	Nation	Player
1	GK	AND	Xisco Pires
2	DF	ESP	Juan Mutis
3	DF	ARG	Matteo Prina
4	DF	POR	Daniel Sanches
5	DF	ESP	Maikel Tijan
6	DF	ESP	Isma Escobar
7	FW	ARG	Fabricio Conci
8	MF	ESP	Sohaib Boulayoune
9	FW	ESP	Ayman Hasni
10	FW	ESP	Jordi Betriu
11	FW	MAR	Imad El Kabbou
14	MF	ESP	Marc Castells
15	FW	IND	Viraj Arora
16	DF	ESP	Bernat Merinas
17	MF	ESP	Ismael Ramos
19	FW	PER	Jeisson Martínez

No.	Pos.	Nation	Player
20	MF	POR	Rodrigo Bastos
21	DF	ESP	José Boukhetache
22	DF	ESP	Carlos Mario Garzón
23	MF	ESP	Jorge Mencía
24	MF	ESP	Juan Rael
25	GK	AND	Alex Jauregui
30	MF	ESP	Armand Font
31	FW	FRA	Brice Ghussein
37	DF	FRA	Raymond Inwen
73	GK	ESP	Walid Birrou
77	MF	POR	Afonso Correia
80	MF	ESP	Pau Servat
94	FW	ESP	Arnau Teixidor
99	GK	ESP	Julen Fernández
—	DF	ESP	Iván Álvarez

== Honours ==
- Segona Divisió
  - Winners (3) : 2012–13, 2017–18, 2020–21

== League history ==
Season	Division	Pos.	Pl.	W	D	L	GF	GA	P
2012–13	Segona Divisió	1	22	22	0	0	119	10	66
2013–14	Primera Divisió	5	20	9	5	6	41	34	32
2014–15	Primera Divisió	5	20	10	3	7	36	29	33
2015–16	Primera Divisió	6	20	8	2	10	32	44	26
2016–17	Primera Divisió	7	21	3	3	15	24	49	12
2017–18	Segona Divisió	1	22	17	2	3	97	20	53
2018–19	Primera Divisió	5	27	10	3	14	34	39	33
2019–20	Primera Divisió	8	24	2	3	19	15	64	9
2020–21	Segona Divisió	1	20	15	4	1	57	15	49
