= Penya Encarnada d'Andorra =

Association football club in Andorra

Penya d'Andorra
- Full name: Fútbol Club Penya d'Andorra
- Nickname: La Penya
- Founded: 2009; 17 years ago
- Ground: Andorra Football Federation stadiums
- Chairman: José Manuel da Costa
- Manager: Aleix Carbonell
- League: Primera Divisió
Home colours	Away colours

Fútbol Club Penya d'Andorra is an Andorran professional football club created by fans of the Portuguese club Benfica, based in Andorra La Vella. The club currently plays in the Primera Divisió.

== History ==
FC Penya d'Andorra, formerly known as Associació Club Penya Encarnada d'Andorra, was founded in 2009 as a cultural association for the promotion of football and sport in the parish of Andorra la Vella in defense of the name and honor of the House of Benfica. The team was for the first time promoted to Primera Divisió after finishing first in the 2014–15 season of Segona Divisió.

Although the club was relegated the following season to Segona Divisió they competed a two-legged relegation play-off for one spot in 2017–18 Primera Divisió against FC Ordino. Penya Encarnada won 5–3 on aggregate and were promoted to Primera Divisió. After the 2018 relegation the club returned to the Primera Divisió in 2020.

== Colors and badge ==
The original colors and badge invoked its Portuguese identity and were related, along with the local club Casa Estrella del Benfica, with the Portuguese club Benfica. The traditional club colors were red and black, thus given the club's nickname encarnados (the red ones), and the badge was a minor variation of the Benfica's sports club.

Old badge until 2020.

Original first kit.

== Honours ==
- Segona Divisió
  - Champions (3): 2014–15, 2019–20, 2021–22

== Recent seasons ==
League	Season	Pos	Pld	W	D	L	GF	GA	GD	Pts
Segona Divisió	2009–10	7	14	1	0	13	13	57	−44	3
Segona Divisió	2010–11	7	18	4	1	13	27	50	−23	13
Segona Divisió	2011–12	9	18	2	3	13	26	62	−36	9
Segona Divisió	2012–13	11	22	5	0	17	30	103	−73	15
Segona Divisió	2013–14	14	14	1	1	12	13	74	−61	4
Segona Divisió	2014–15	1	16	13	2	1	70	23	+47	41
Primera Divisió	2015–16	8	20	1	3	16	15	58	-43	3
Segona Divisió	2016–17	2	23	17	4	2	89	27	+62	55
Primera Divisió	2017–18	8	27	3	2	22	15	126	-111	11
Segona Divisió	2018–19	4	23	15	2	6	70	31	+39	47
Segona Divisió	2019–20	1	16	15	1	0	53	7	+46	46

== Current squad ==
As of October 2026

Note: Flags indicate national team as defined under FIFA eligibility rules; some limited exceptions apply. Players may hold more than one non-FIFA nationality.

No.	Pos.	Nation	Player
1	GK	ESP	Alejandro Maqueda
2	DF	BRA	Richard Martinho
3	DF	MEX	Miguel Basulto
4	DF	CHI	Ricardo Escobar
5	DF	CHI	Reinaldo Ahumada
6	DF	BRA	Alan Henrique
8	MF	ESP	Javi García
9	FW	ESA	Jacob Sincuir
12	DF	USA	Ángel Ricardo
14	FW	ESP	Diego Hady
15	DF	MEX	Luis Lee

No.	Pos.	Nation	Player
17	FW	ETH	Natnael Baileyegn
18	MF	CHI	Daniel Mansilla
20	MF	FRA	Donovan Tchamba
21	DF	ESP	Rubén Garcés
22	FW	ESP	Brian Rodríguez
23	DF	FRA	Théo Vallotti
24	MF	FRA	Rony Jourson
25	FW	ESP	Diego Llorente
27	MF	CHI	Ignacio Pinilla
47	MF	AND	César Rodríguez
50	GK	ESP	Juanda Terrádez

== Personnel ==
=== Technical staff ===
Position	Name
Head coach	Aleix Carbonell
Assistant coach	Hadson Nery
Assistant coach	Sergi Lirola
Assistant coach	Lluís Lladò
Goalkeeping coach	Guillem Ruig
Fitness coach	Enric Cabrera
