= 2010–11 UEFA Europa League qualifying (first and second round matches) =

European football competition

This page summarises the matches of the first and second qualifying rounds of 2010–11 UEFA Europa League qualifying.

Times are CEST (UTC+2), as listed by UEFA (local times, if different, are in parentheses).

== First qualifying round ==
=== Summary ===
The first legs were played on 1 July, and the second legs were played on 8 July 2010.

Team 1	Agg.	Team 2	1st leg	2nd leg
UE Santa Coloma (Andorra)	0–5	(Montenegro) Mogren	0–3	0–2
Olimpija Ljubljana (Slovenia)	0–5	(Bosnia and Herzegovina) Široki Brijeg	0–2	0–3
Anorthosis Famagusta (Cyprus)	4–0	(Armenia) Banants	3–0	1–0
Olimpia Bălți (Moldova)	1–1 (a) (Note: Order of legs reversed after original draw.)	(Azerbaijan) Khazar Lankaran	0–0	1–1
Šibenik (Croatia)	3–0	(Malta) Sliema Wanderers	0–0	3–0
Tobol (Kazakhstan)	2–4	(Bosnia and Herzegovina) Zrinjski Mostar	1–2	1–2
Ulisses (Armenia)	0–1	(Israel) Bnei Yehuda	0–0	0–1
Rabotnicki (North Macedonia)	11–0	(Andorra) Lusitanos	5–0	6–0
Tirana (Albania)	1–0	(Hungary) Zalaegerszeg	0–0	1–0 (a.e.t.)
Zestaponi (Georgia (country))	5–0	(San Marino) Faetano	5–0	0–0
NSÍ (Faroe Islands)	1–4	(Sweden) Gefle IF	0–2	1–2
Torpedo Zhodino (Belarus)	6–1	(Iceland) Fylkir	3–0	3–1
Randers (Denmark)	7–3	(Luxembourg) F91 Dudelange	6–1	1–2
Portadown (Northern Ireland)	2–1	(Latvia) Skonto	1–1	1–0
TPS (Finland)	7–1	(Wales) Port Talbot Town	3–1	4–0
KR (Iceland)	5–2	(Northern Ireland) Glentoran	3–0	2–2
Grevenmacher (Luxembourg)	4–5	(Republic of Ireland) Dundalk	3–3	1–2
Kalmar FF (Sweden)	4–0	(Faroe Islands) EB/Streymur	1–0	3–0
Llanelli (Wales)	4–5	(Lithuania) Tauras Tauragė	2–2	2–3 (a.e.t.)
Narva Trans (Estonia)	0–7	(Finland) MYPA	0–2	0–5
Zeta (Montenegro)	1–1 (a)	(Moldova) Dacia Chișinău	1–1	0–0
Laçi (Albania)	2–8	(Belarus) Dnepr Mogilev	1–1	1–7
Shakhter Karagandy (Kazakhstan)	1–3	(Poland) Ruch Chorzów	1–2	0–1
Dinamo Tbilisi (Georgia (country))	2–1	(Estonia) Flora	2–1	0–0
Nitra (Slovakia)	3–5	(Hungary) Győri ETO	2–2	1–3
Qarabağ (Azerbaijan)	5–2	(North Macedonia) Metalurg Skopje	4–1	1–1

=== Matches ===
1 July 2010
19:00

UE Santa Coloma (Andorra)	0–3	(Montenegro) Mogren
	Report	Grbić 14'; Čulafić 83'; Ćetković 90+3'

Camp d'Esports del M.I. Consell General, Andorra la Vella (Note: Played in Andorra la Vella at the Camp d'Esports del M.I. Consell General as the grass in Estadi Comunal d'Andorra la Vella was being replaced. This grass replacement led to the 3–0 loss awarded to FC Santa Coloma on the first leg of the UEFA Champions League first qualifying round against Birkirkara.)
Attendance: 450
Referee: Ioannis Anastasiou (Cyprus)
8 July 2010
17:30

Mogren (Montenegro)	2–0	(Andorra) UE Santa Coloma
Ćulafić 18'; Gluščević 20'	Report

Stadion Gradski, Nikšić (Note: Played in Nikšić at Stadion Gradski as Mogren's Stadion Mogren did not meet UEFA criteria.)
Attendance: 200
Referee: David Kharitonashvili (Georgia)

Mogren won 5–0 on aggregate.

1 July 2010
20:45

Olimpija Ljubljana (Slovenia)	0–2	(Bosnia and Herzegovina) Široki Brijeg
	Report	Wagner 45+1'; Renato 68'

Sports Park, Domžale (Note: Played in Domžale at the Sports Park as Olimpija Ljubljana's ŽŠD Ljubljana Stadium did not meet UEFA criteria.)
Attendance: 1,700
Referee: Olivier Thual (France)
8 July 2010
20:30

Široki Brijeg (Bosnia and Herzegovina)	3–0	(Slovenia) Olimpija Ljubljana
Roskam 81'; Weitzer 83'; Mišić 90+3'	Report

Pecara Stadium, Široki Brijeg
Attendance: 3,000
Referee: Vladislav Bezborodov (Russia)

Široki Brijeg won 5–0 on aggregate.

1 July 2010
19:00

Anorthosis Famagusta (Cyprus)	3–0	(Armenia) Banants
Katsavakis 23'; Okkas 31'; Cafú 64'	Report

Antonis Papadopoulos Stadium, Larnaca
Attendance: 7,300
Referee: Steven McLean (Scotland)
8 July 2010
17:00

Banants (Armenia)	0–1	(Cyprus) Anorthosis Famagusta
	Report	Laban 37'

Hanrapetakan Stadium, Yerevan
Attendance: 3,000
Referee: Christof Virant (Belgium)

Anorthosis Famagusta won 4–0 on aggregate.

1 July 2010
18:00

Olimpia Bălți (Moldova)	0–0	(Azerbaijan) Khazar Lankaran
	Report

Zimbru Stadium, Chișinău (Note: Played in Chișinău at the Zimbru Stadium as Olimpia Bălți's Olimpia Bălți Stadium did not meet UEFA criteria.)
Attendance: 5,800
Referee: Vadims Direktorenko (Latvia)
8 July 2010
18:00

Khazar Lankaran (Azerbaijan)	1–1	(Moldova) Olimpia Bălți
Lalín 78'	Report	Robens 14'

Lankaran City Stadium, Lankaran
Attendance: 11,250
Referee: Vitaly Sevostyanik (Belarus)

1–1 on aggregate; Olimpia Bălți won on away goals.

1 July 2010
18:30

Šibenik (Croatia)	0–0	(Malta) Sliema Wanderers
	Report

Stadion Hrvatski vitezovi, Dugopolje (Note: Played in Dugopolje at Stadion Hrvatski vitezovi as Šibenik's Stadion Šubićevac did not meet UEFA criteria.)
Attendance: 2,000
Referee: Markus Strömbergsson (Sweden)
8 July 2010
17:30

Sliema Wanderers (Malta)	0–3	(Croatia) Šibenik
	Report	Medvid 64'; Jakoliš 73'; Bulat 89'

Centenary Stadium, Ta' Qali
Attendance: 480
Referee: Alan Black (Northern Ireland)

Šibenik won 3–0 on aggregate.

1 July 2010
16:00

Tobol (Kazakhstan)	1–2	(Bosnia and Herzegovina) Zrinjski Mostar
Zhumaskaliyev 13'	Report	Dragičević 53', 82'

Central Stadium, Kostanay
Attendance: 6,500
Referee: Dawid Piasecki (Poland)
8 July 2010
19:30

Zrinjski Mostar (Bosnia and Herzegovina)	2–1	(Kazakhstan) Tobol
Džidić 10'; Pehar 72'	Report	Zhumaskaliyev 57'

Bijeli Brijeg Stadium, Mostar
Attendance: 5,000
Referee: Stavros Tritsonis (Greece)

Zrinjski Mostar won 4–2 on aggregate.

1 July 2010
16:00

Ulisses (Armenia)	0–0	(Israel) Bnei Yehuda
	Report

Hrazdan Stadium, Yerevan
Attendance: 2,000
Referee: Lorenc Jemini (Albania)
8 July 2010
18:00

Bnei Yehuda (Israel)	1–0	(Armenia) Ulisses
Menashe 45+1'	Report

Bloomfield Stadium, Tel Aviv
Attendance: 1,313
Referee: Stephan Studer (Switzerland)

Bnei Yehuda won 1–0 on aggregate.

1 July 2010
17:00

Rabotnicki (North Macedonia)	5–0	(Andorra) Lusitanos
Zé Carlos 24'; Wandeir 35'; Silva 55', 56'; Muarem 60'	Report

Philip II Arena, Skopje
Attendance: 800
Referee: Ionut Marius Avram (Romania)
8 July 2010
19:15

Lusitanos (Andorra)	0–6	(North Macedonia) Rabotnicki
	Report	Wandeir 25', 68'; Silva 33', 42', 54'; Gligorov 71'

Estadi Comunal d'Andorra la Vella, Andorra la Vella
Attendance: 450
Referee: Clayton Pisani (Malta)

Rabotnicki won 11–0 on aggregate.

1 July 2010
17:30

Tirana (Albania)	0–0	(Hungary) Zalaegerszeg
	Report

Qemal Stafa Stadium, Tirana (Note: Played in Tirana at the Qemal Stafa Stadium as Tirana's Selman Stërmasi Stadium did not meet UEFA criteria.)
Attendance: 1,854
Referee: Raymond Crangle (Northern Ireland)
8 July 2010
19:00

Zalaegerszeg (Hungary)	0–1 (a.e.t.)	(Albania) Tirana
	Report	Karabeci 107'

ZTE Arena, Zalaegerszeg
Attendance: 4,000
Referee: Ilias Spathas (Greece)

Tirana won 1–0 on aggregate.

1 July 2010
18:00

Zestaponi (Georgia (country))	5–0	(San Marino) Faetano
Gelashvili 20' (pen.), 23'; Dvali 22', 64'; Gorgiashvili 90'	Report

David Abashidze Stadium, Zestaponi
Attendance: 900
Referee: Vlado Glodjović (Serbia)
8 July 2010
20:30

Faetano (San Marino)	0–0	(Georgia (country)) Zestaponi
	Report

Stadio Olimpico, Serravalle
Attendance: 500
Referee: Ignasi Villamayor Rozados (Andorra)

Zestaponi won 5–0 on aggregate.

1 July 2010
20:00

NSÍ (Faroe Islands)	0–2	(Sweden) Gefle IF
	Report	Gerndt 34', 60'

Gundadalur, Tórshavn (Note: Played in Tórshavn at the Gundadalur as NSÍ's Runavík Stadium did not meet UEFA criteria.)
Attendance: 370
Referee: Nerijus Dunauskas (Lithuania)
8 July 2010
19:00

Gefle IF (Sweden)	2–1	(Faroe Islands) NSÍ
Bernhardsson 22'; Berggren 63'	Report	Potemkin 90+4'

Råsunda Stadium, Solna (Note: Played in Solna at Råsunda Stadium as Gefle IF's Strömvallen did not meet UEFA criteria.)
Attendance: 380
Referee: Tero Nieminen (Finland)

Gefle IF won 4–1 on aggregate.

1 July 2010
17:30

Torpedo Zhodino (Belarus)	3–0	(Iceland) Fylkir
Kryvobok 52'; Ogar 59'; Kantsavy 66'	Report

Torpedo Stadium, Zhodino
Attendance: 2,500
Referee: Ján Valášek (Slovakia)
8 July 2010
21:00

Fylkir (Iceland)	1–3	(Belarus) Torpedo Zhodino
Faye 32' (pen.)	Report	Ostroukh 41'; Kryvobok 86' (pen.), 88'

Laugardalsvöllur, Reykjavík (Note: Played in Reykjavík at Laugardalsvöllur as Fylkir's Fylkisvöllur did not meet UEFA criteria.)
Attendance: 658
Referee: Slavko Vinčić (Slovenia)

Torpedo Zhodino won 6–1 on aggregate.

1 July 2010
19:00

Randers (Denmark)	6–1	(Luxembourg) F91 Dudelange
Sane 16'; Movsisyan 17', 90'; Olsen 33'; Pedersen 47' (pen.); Brock-Madsen 88'	Report	Benzouien 49' (pen.)

Essex Park Randers, Randers
Attendance: 3,068
Referee: Pavle Radovanović (Montenegro)
8 July 2010
18:30

F91 Dudelange (Luxembourg)	2–1	(Denmark) Randers
Caillet 37'; Gruszczyński 67'	Report	Lorentzen 17'

Stade Jos Nosbaum, Dudelange
Attendance: 636
Referee: Thoroddur Hjaltalin (Iceland)

Randers won 7–3 on aggregate.

1 July 2010
19:30

Portadown (Northern Ireland)	1–1	(Latvia) Skonto
Lecky 38'	Report	Laizāns 90+3'

Shamrock Park, Portadown
Attendance: 571
Referee: Domagoj Vučkov (Croatia)
8 July 2010
18:00

Skonto (Latvia)	0–1	(Northern Ireland) Portadown
	Report	Lecky 29'

Skonto Stadium, Riga
Attendance: 6,000
Referee: Vladimir Vnuk (Slovakia)

Portadown won 2–1 on aggregate.

1 July 2010
18:00

TPS (Finland)	3–1	(Wales) Port Talbot Town
Riku Riski 24', 35'; Wusu 30'	Report	Rose 70'

Veritas Stadion, Turku
Attendance: 1,405
Referee: Marcin Szulc (Poland)
8 July 2010
19:15

Port Talbot Town (Wales)	0–4	(Finland) TPS
	Report	Wusu 26'; Kolehmainen 32'; Riku Riski 69'; Roope Riski 90+1'

Genquip Stadium, Port Talbot
Attendance: 676
Referee: Petur Reinert (Faroe Islands)

TPS won 7–1 on aggregate.

1 July 2010
21:15

KR (Iceland)	3–0	(Northern Ireland) Glentoran
Gunnarsson 12'; Finnbogason 32'; Takefusa 62'	Report

KR-völlur, Reykjavík
Attendance: 813
Referee: Sergey Tsinkevich (Belarus)
8 July 2010
20:30

Glentoran (Northern Ireland)	2–2	(Iceland) KR
Callacher 22'; Hamilton 56' (pen.)	Report	Finnbogason 45+1'; Black 54' (o.g.)

The Oval, Belfast
Attendance: 771
Referee: Marios Panayi (Cyprus)

KR won 5–2 on aggregate.

1 July 2010
19:30

Grevenmacher (Luxembourg)	3–3	(Republic of Ireland) Dundalk
Heinz 63'; Gaspar 73'; Almeida 76'	Report	Kudozović 26'; Hatswell 51'; Benichou 80' (o.g.)

Stade Josy Barthel, Luxembourg City (Note: Played in Luxembourg City at the Stade Josy Barthel as Grevenmacher's Op Flohr Stadion did not meet UEFA criteria.)
Attendance: 731
Referee: Emir Alečković (Bosnia and Herzegovina)
8 July 2010
20:00

Dundalk (Republic of Ireland)	2–1	(Luxembourg) Grevenmacher
Fenn 5' (pen.); Kudozović 16'	Report	Müller 90+1'

Oriel Park, Dundalk
Attendance: 2,000
Referee: Magnus Thorisson (Iceland)

Dundalk won 5–4 on aggregate.

1 July 2010
21:00

Kalmar FF (Sweden)	1–0	(Faroe Islands) EB/Streymur
Ricardo Santos 79'	Report

Fredriksskans, Kalmar
Attendance: 1,082
Referee: Stefano Podeschi (San Marino)
8 July 2010
20:00

EB/Streymur (Faroe Islands)	0–3	(Sweden) Kalmar FF
	Report	Israelsson 9'; Eriksson 47'; Ricardo Santos 50'

Svangaskarð, Toftir (Note: Played in Toftir at Svangaskarð as EB/Streymur's Við Margáir did not meet UEFA criteria.)
Attendance: 607
Referee: Ken Henry Johnsen (Norway)

Kalmar FF won 4–0 on aggregate.

1 July 2010
20:05

Llanelli (Wales)	2–2	(Lithuania) Tauras Tauragė
Thomas 17'; S. Jones 47'	Report	Kižys 9', 20'

Stebonheath Park, Llanelli
Attendance: 556
Referee: Luc Wouters (Belgium)
8 July 2010
17:00

Tauras Tauragė (Lithuania)	3–2 (a.e.t.)	(Wales) Llanelli
Irha 17', 31'; Regelskis 104'	Report	Llewellyn 19'; Bowen 36'

S. Darius and S. Girėnas Stadium, Kaunas (Note: Played in Kaunas at S. Darius and S. Girėnas Stadium as Tauras Tauragė's Vytautas Stadium did not meet UEFA criteria.)
Attendance: 350
Referee: Goran Spirkoski (Macedonia)

Tauras Tauragė won 5–4 on aggregate.

1 July 2010
17:00

Narva Trans (Estonia)	0–2	(Finland) MYPA
	Report	Votinov 47'; Gorškov 53' (o.g.)

Lilleküla Stadium, Tallinn (Note: Played in Tallinn at the Lilleküla Stadium as Narva Trans's Narva Kreenholmi Stadium did not meet UEFA criteria.)
Attendance: 150
Referee: Nikola Dabanović (Montenegro)
8 July 2010
18:00

MYPA (Finland)	5–0	(Estonia) Narva Trans
Ricketts 62'; Äijälä 67', 74'; Koljonen 77'; Felipe Benevides 80'	Report

Saviniemi, Kouvola
Attendance: 1,127
Referee: Sergei Karasev (Russia)

MYPA won 7–0 on aggregate.

1 July 2010
17:30

Zeta (Montenegro)	1–1	(Moldova) Dacia Chișinău
Z. Peličić 77' (pen.)	Report	Orbu 39'

Stadion Gradski, Nikšić (Note: Played in Nikšić at the Stadion Gradski as Zeta's Trešnjica Stadium did not meet UEFA criteria.)
Attendance: 1,500
Referee: Vusal Aliyev (Azerbaijan)
8 July 2010
18:30

Dacia Chișinău (Moldova)	0–0	(Montenegro) Zeta
	Report

Zimbru Stadium, Chișinău (Note: Played in Chișinău at Zimbru Stadium as Dacia Chișinău's Dinamo Stadium did not meet UEFA criteria.)
Attendance: 6,200
Referee: Alexandre Kostadinov (Bulgaria)

1–1 on aggregate; Dacia Chișinău won on away goals.

1 July 2010
16:30

Laçi (Albania)	1–1	(Belarus) Dnepr Mogilev
Marashi 45+1'	Report	Turlin 90+2'

Stadiumi Niko Dovana, Durrës (Note: Played in Durrës at the Stadiumi Niko Dovana as Laçi's Stadiumi Laçi did not meet UEFA criteria.)
Attendance: 2,000
Referee: Igor Pristovnik (Croatia)
8 July 2010
18:00

Dnepr Mogilev (Belarus)	7–1	(Albania) Laçi
Bychenok 10', 80'; Yurchenko 17' (pen.), 56', 81'; Zyankovich 42'; Černych 87'	Report	Nimani 60'

Spartak Stadium, Mogilev
Attendance: 3,500
Referee: Vahan Minasyan (Armenia)

Dnepr Mogilev won 8–2 on aggregate.

1 July 2010
17:00

Shakhter Karagandy (Kazakhstan)	1–2	(Poland) Ruch Chorzów
Đidić 7'	Report	Janoszka 45+1'; Grzyb 48' (pen.)

Shakhtyor Stadium, Karagandy
Attendance: 10,000
Referee: Gerhard Grobelnik (Austria)
8 July 2010
20:30

Ruch Chorzów (Poland)	1–0	(Kazakhstan) Shakhter Karagandy
Sobiech 59'	Report

Stadion Miejski, Chorzów
Attendance: 6,000
Referee: Gediminas Mažeika (Lithuania)

Ruch Chorzów won 3–1 on aggregate.

1 July 2010
16:00

Dinamo Tbilisi (Georgia (country))	2–1	(Estonia) Flora
Kakhelishvili 22'; Khmaladze 63' (pen.)	Report	Dupikov 9'

Boris Paichadze Stadium, Tbilisi
Attendance: 2,500
Referee: Eli Hacmon (Israel)
8 July 2010
17:45

Flora (Estonia)	0–0	(Georgia (country)) Dinamo Tbilisi
	Report

Lilleküla Stadium, Tallinn
Attendance: 632
Referee: Yuriy Moseychuk (Ukraine)

Dinamo Tbilisi won 2–1 on aggregate.

1 July 2010
18:00

Nitra (Slovakia)	2–2	(Hungary) Győri ETO
Tóth 14'; Sloboda 80'	Report	Kink 39', 58'

Štadión pod Zoborom, Nitra
Attendance: 2,560
Referee: Marios Stamatis (Cyprus)
8 July 2010
18:30

Győri ETO (Hungary)	3–1	(Slovakia) Nitra
Aleksidze 22'; Nicorec 60'; Kink 90+2'	Report	Hodúr 10'

ETO Park, Győr
Attendance: 4,200
Referee: Matej Jug (Slovenia)

Győri ETO won 5–3 on aggregate.

1 July 2010
18:00

Qarabağ (Azerbaijan)	4–1	(North Macedonia) Metalurg Skopje
Sadygov 26'; Ismayilov 45'; Imamaliev 84'; Adamia 90+2'	Report	Simonovski 90+4'

Tofiq Bahramov Stadium, Baku (Note: Played in Baku at Tofiq Bahramov Stadium as Qarabağ's Guzanli Olympic Stadium did not meet UEFA criteria.)
Attendance: 6,000
Referee: István Kovács (Romania)
8 July 2010
17:00

Metalurg Skopje (North Macedonia)	1–1	(Azerbaijan) Qarabağ
Krstev 78'	Report	Imamaliev 69'

Philip II Arena, Skopje (Note: Played in Skopje at Philip II Arena as Metalurg Skopje's Železarnica Stadium did not meet UEFA criteria.)
Attendance: 860
Referee: Andriy Shandor (Ukraine)

Qarabağ won 5–2 on aggregate.

== Second qualifying round ==
=== Summary ===
The first legs were played on 15 July, and the second legs were played on 22 and 23 July 2010.

Team 1	Agg.	Team 2	1st leg	2nd leg
Cercle Brugge (Belgium)	2–2 (a)	(Finland) TPS	0–1	2–1
Motherwell (Scotland)	2–0	(Iceland) Breiðablik	1–0	1–0
Anorthosis Famagusta (Cyprus)	3–2 (Note: Order of legs reversed after original draw.)	(Croatia) Šibenik	0–2	3–0 (a.e.t.)
Lausanne-Sport (Switzerland)	2–1	(Bosnia and Herzegovina) Borac Banja Luka	1–0	1–1
Šiauliai (Lithuania)	0–7	(Poland) Wisła Kraków	0–2	0–5
Kalmar FF (Sweden)	2–0	(Moldova) Dacia Chișinău	0–0	2–0
Utrecht (Netherlands)	5–1	(Albania) Tirana	4–0	1–1
HIT Gorica (Slovenia)	1–4	(Denmark) Randers	0–3	1–1
Marítimo (Portugal)	6–4	(Republic of Ireland) Sporting Fingal	3–2	3–2
Sūduva (Lithuania)	2–6	(Austria) Rapid Wien	0–2	2–4
Ventspils (Latvia)	1–3	(North Macedonia) Teteks	0–0	1–3
OFK Beograd (Serbia)	3–2	(Belarus) Torpedo Zhodino	2–2	1–0
Olimpia Bălți (Moldova)	1–7	(Romania) Dinamo București	0–2	1–5
MYPA (Finland)	8–0	(Andorra) Sant Julià	3–0	5–0 (Note: Original match abandoned in the 80th minute due to adverse weather conditions, with MYPA leading 1–0. The match was replayed on 23 July 2010 at 18:30 CEST from the beginning.)
Videoton (Hungary)	1–3	(Slovenia) Maribor	1–1	0–2
Brøndby (Denmark)	3–0	(Liechtenstein) Vaduz	3–0	0–0
Stabæk (Norway)	3–3 (a)	(Belarus) Dnepr Mogilev	2–2	1–1
Shamrock Rovers (Republic of Ireland)	2–1	(Israel) Bnei Yehuda	1–1	1–0
IF Elfsborg (Sweden)	3–1	(Moldova) Iskra-Stal	2–1	1–0
KR (Iceland)	2–6	(Ukraine) Karpaty Lviv	0–3	2–3
Maccabi Tel Aviv (Israel)	3–2	(Montenegro) Mogren	2–0	1–2
Austria Wien	3–2	(Bosnia and Herzegovina) Široki Brijeg	2–2	1–0
Tauras Tauragė (Lithuania)	1–6	(Cyprus) APOEL	0–3	1–3
Molde (Norway)	2–2 (a)	(Latvia) Jelgava	1–0	1–2
Zestaponi (Georgia (country))	3–1	(Slovakia) Dukla Banská Bystrica	3–0	0–1
Honka (Finland)	2–3	(Wales) Bangor City	1–1	1–2
Levski Sofia (Bulgaria)	8–0	(Republic of Ireland) Dundalk	6–0	2–0
WIT Georgia (Georgia (country))	0–6	(Czech Republic) Baník Ostrava	0–6	0–0
Rabotnicki (North Macedonia)	1–0	(Armenia) Mika	1–0	0–0
Atyrau (Kazakhstan)	0–5	(Hungary) Győri ETO	0–3 (Note: UEFA awarded Győri ETO a 3–0 win due to Atyrau fielding a suspended player in the first leg. The original match had ended in a 2–0 win for Győri ETO.)	0–2
Portadown (Northern Ireland)	2–3	(Azerbaijan) Qarabağ	1–2	1–1
Beşiktaş (Turkey)	7–0	(Faroe Islands) Víkingur Gøta	3–0	4–0
Differdange 03 (Luxembourg)	3–5	(Serbia) Spartak Zlatibor Voda	3–3	0–2
Dinamo Minsk (Belarus)	10–1	(Estonia) Sillamäe Kalev	5–1	5–0
Valletta (Malta)	1–1 (a)	(Poland) Ruch Chorzów	1–1	0–0
Baku (Azerbaijan)	2–4	(Montenegro) Budućnost Podgorica	0–3 (Note: UEFA awarded Budućnost Podgorica a 3–0 win due to Baku fielding a suspended player in the first leg. The original match had ended in a 2–1 win for Baku.)	2–1
Zrinjski Mostar (Bosnia and Herzegovina)	13–3	(San Marino) Tre Penne	4–1	9–2
Gefle IF (Sweden)	2–4	(Georgia (country)) Dinamo Tbilisi	1–2	1–2
Cliftonville (Northern Ireland)	1–0	(Croatia) Cibalia	1–0	0–0
Besa (Albania)	1–11	(Greece) Olympiacos	0–5	1–6

=== Matches ===
15 July 2010
19:45

Cercle Brugge (Belgium)	0–1	(Finland) TPS
	Report	Ääritalo 32'

Jules Ottenstadion, Ghent (Note: Played in Ghent at Jules Ottenstadion as Cercle Brugge's Jan Breydel Stadium is undergoing renovative work.)
Attendance: 2,754
Referee: Anders Hermansen (Denmark)
22 July 2010
18:00

TPS (Finland)	1–2	(Belgium) Cercle Brugge
Johansson 39' (pen.)	Report	Reynaldo 51'; Van Eenoo 86'

Veritas Stadion, Turku
Attendance: 4,020
Referee: Bernhard Brugger (Austria)

2–2 on aggregate; Cercle Brugge won on away goals.

15 July 2010
20:45

Motherwell (Scotland)	1–0	(Iceland) Breiðablik
Forbes 63'	Report

Fir Park, Motherwell
Attendance: 5,990
Referee: David Fernández Borbalán (Spain)
22 July 2010
21:15

Breiðablik (Iceland)	0–1	(Scotland) Motherwell
	Report	Murphy 42'

Kópavogsvöllur, Kópavogur
Attendance: 1,700
Referee: Carlos Xistra (Portugal)

Motherwell won 2–0 on aggregate.

15 July 2010
19:00

Anorthosis Famagusta (Cyprus)	0–2	(Croatia) Šibenik
	Report	Bloudek 10'; Bačelić-Grgić 61' (pen.)

Antonis Papadopoulos Stadium, Larnaca
Attendance: 7,500
Referee: Andre Marriner (England)
22 July 2010
20:00

Šibenik (Croatia)	0–3 (a.e.t.)	(Cyprus) Anorthosis Famagusta
	Report	Laban 16'; Cristóvão 25'; Okkas 96'

Stadion Poljud, Split (Note: Played in Split at Stadion Poljud as Šibenik's Stadion Šubićevac did not meet UEFA criteria.)
Attendance: 2,850
Referee: Pol van Boekel (Netherlands)

Anorthosis Famagusta won 3–2 on aggregate.

15 July 2010
19:30

Lausanne-Sport (Switzerland)	1–0	(Bosnia and Herzegovina) Borac Banja Luka
Silvio 19'	Report

Stade Olympique de la Pontaise, Lausanne
Attendance: 3,850
Referee: Vladimir Pettay (Russia)
22 July 2010
20:45

Borac Banja Luka (Bosnia and Herzegovina)	1–1	(Switzerland) Lausanne-Sport
Vukelja 69'	Report	Roux 65'

City Stadium of Banja Luka, Banja Luka
Attendance: 9,000
Referee: Artur Soares Dias (Portugal)

Lausanne-Sport won 2–1 on aggregate.

15 July 2010
20:00

Šiauliai (Lithuania)	0–2	(Poland) Wisła Kraków
	Report	Pa. Brożek 78'; Pi. Brożek 80'

Savivaldybė Stadium, Šiauliai
Attendance: 2,400
Referee: Meir Levi (Israel)
22 July 2010
20:00

Wisła Kraków (Poland)	5–0	(Lithuania) Šiauliai
Pi. Brożek 23'; Żurawski 48'; Díaz 62'; Pa. Brożek 67'; Boguski 90'	Report

Suche Stawy, Kraków
Attendance: 5,500
Referee: João Ferreira (Portugal)

Wisła Kraków won 7–0 on aggregate.

15 July 2010
19:30

Kalmar FF (Sweden)	0–0	(Moldova) Dacia Chișinău
	Report

Fredriksskans, Kalmar
Attendance: 1,976
Referee: Jan Jilek (Czech Republic)
22 July 2010
18:30

Dacia Chișinău (Moldova)	0–2	(Sweden) Kalmar FF
	Report	Israelsson 12'; Daniel Sobralense 88'

Zimbru Stadium, Chișinău
Attendance: 6,000
Referee: Pawel Gil (Poland)

Kalmar FF won 2–0 on aggregate.

15 July 2010
20:00

Utrecht (Netherlands)	4–0	(Albania) Tirana
Van Wolfswinkel 8', 26'; Asare 30'; Mertens 75'	Report

Stadion Galgenwaard, Utrecht
Attendance: 9,900
Referee: Stelios Trifonos (Cyprus)
22 July 2010
19:30

Tirana (Albania)	1–1	(Netherlands) Utrecht
Lila 11'	Report	Van Wolfswinkel 3'

Qemal Stafa Stadium, Tirana
Attendance: 3,000
Referee: Radek Matejek (Czech Republic)

Utrecht won 5–1 on aggregate.

15 July 2010
18:00

HIT Gorica (Slovenia)	0–3	(Denmark) Randers
	Report	Lorentzen 51'; Cramer 55', 71'

Stadion Športni Park, Nova Gorica
Attendance: 600
Referee: Halis Özkahya (Turkey)
22 July 2010
19:00

Randers (Denmark)	1–1	(Slovenia) HIT Gorica
Cramer 42'	Report	Žigon 79'

Essex Park Randers, Randers
Attendance: 2,171
Referee: Alan Muir (Scotland)

Randers won 4–1 on aggregate.

15 July 2010
20:45

Marítimo (Portugal)	3–2	(Republic of Ireland) Sporting Fingal
Esteves 78'; Cherrad 85'; Tchô 90+5'	Report	Crowe 33'; Fitzgerald 87'

Estádio da Madeira, Funchal (Note: Played in Funchal at Estádio da Madeira as Marítimo's Estádio dos Barreiros is undergoing extensive renovative work.)
Attendance: 1,961
Referee: Luc Wilmes (Luxembourg)
22 July 2010
20:45

Sporting Fingal (Republic of Ireland)	2–3	(Portugal) Marítimo
Zayed 81', 89'	Report	Alonso 20' (pen.); Marquinho 67'; Kanu 86'

Dalymount Park, Dublin (Note: Played in Dublin at Dalymount Park as Sporting Fingal's Morton Stadium did not meet UEFA criteria.)
Attendance: 2,150
Referee: Marco Borg (Malta)

Marítimo won 6–4 on aggregate.

15 July 2010
20:15

Sūduva (Lithuania)	0–2	(Austria) Rapid Wien
	Report	Hofmann 12'; Trimmel 81'

Sūduva Stadium, Marijampolė
Attendance: 1,900
Referee: Lars Christoffersen (Denmark)
22 July 2010
20:30

Rapid Wien (Austria)	4–2	(Lithuania) Sūduva
Jelavić 20', 90'; Gartler 86', 89'	Report	Grigaitis 70'; Beniušis 85'

Gerhard Hanappi Stadium, Wien
Attendance: 11,800
Referee: Ante Vučemilović-Šimunović Jr. (Croatia)

Rapid Wien won 6–2 on aggregate.

15 July 2010
18:00

Ventspils (Latvia)	0–0	(North Macedonia) Teteks
	Report

Ventspils Olimpiskais Stadions, Ventspils
Attendance: 2,500
Referee: David Malcolm (Northern Ireland)
22 July 2010
16:30

Teteks (North Macedonia)	3–1	(Latvia) Ventspils
Postnikov 15' (o.g.); Ristevski 34'; Gligorovski 54'	Report	Bespalovs 81'

Philip II Arena, Skopje (Note: Played in Skopje at Philip II Arena as Teteks's City Stadium Tetovo did not meet UEFA criteria.)
Attendance: 2,000
Referee: Harald Lechner (Austria)

Teteks won 3–1 on aggregate.

15 July 2010
17:30

OFK Beograd (Serbia)	2–2	(Belarus) Torpedo Zhodino
Krstić 45+1'; Kantsavy 90+4' (o.g.)	Report	Kryvobok 14'; Brusnikin 90+2'

Omladinski Stadium, Belgrade
Attendance: 300
Referee: Antonio Rubinos Pérez (Spain)
22 July 2010
17:00

Torpedo Zhodino (Belarus)	0–1	(Serbia) OFK Beograd
	Report	Kecojević 67'

Haradski Stadium, Barysaw (Note: Played in Barysaw at Haradski Stadium as Torpedo Zhodino's Torpedo Stadium did not meet UEFA criteria.)
Attendance: 3,100
Referee: Petteri Kari (Finland)

OFK Beograd won 3–2 on aggregate.

15 July 2010
18:00

Olimpia Bălți (Moldova)	0–2	(Romania) Dinamo București
	Report	Pulhac 41'; Ganea 83'

Zimbru Stadium, Chișinău
Attendance: 6,300
Referee: Michael Koukoulakis (Greece)
22 July 2010
19:45

Dinamo București (Romania)	5–1	(Moldova) Olimpia Bălți
Orlovski 4' (o.g.); Cristea 32'; N'Doye 45'; Munteanu 59'; Torje 63' (pen.)	Report	Adaramola 90'

Stadionul Dinamo, Bucharest
Attendance: 4,367
Referee: Antonio Damato (Italy)

Dinamo București won 7–1 on aggregate.

15 July 2010
18:00

MYPA (Finland)	3–0	(Andorra) Sant Julià
Ricketts 43'; Äijälä 56', 65' (pen.)	Report

Saviniemi, Kouvola
Attendance: 1,169
Referee: Albert Toussaint (Luxembourg)
22 July 2010
18:30

Sant Julià (Andorra)	Abandoned (Note: Original match abandoned in the 80th minute due to adverse weather conditions, with MYPA leading 1–0. The match was replayed on 23 July 2010 at 18:30 CEST from the beginning.) (0–1)	(Finland) MYPA
	Report	Votinov 30'

Estadi Comunal d'Andorra la Vella, Andorra la Vella
Attendance: 350
Referee: Mark Steven Whitby (Wales)
23 July 2010
18:30

Sant Julià (Andorra)	0–5	(Finland) MYPA
	Report	Votinov 6', 13', 64'; Kurittu 49'; Okkonen 61'

Estadi Comunal d'Andorra la Vella, Andorra la Vella
Attendance: 60
Referee: Mark Steven Whitby (Wales)

MYPA won 8–0 on aggregate.

15 July 2010
20:30

Videoton (Hungary)	1–1	(Slovenia) Maribor
Horváth 79'	Report	Mezga 30'

ETO Park, Győr (Note: Played in Győr at ETO Park as Videoton's Stadion Sóstói did not meet UEFA criteria.)
Attendance: 3,850
Referee: Viktor Shvetsov (Ukraine)
22 July 2010
20:30

Maribor (Slovenia)	2–0	(Hungary) Videoton
Volaš 39', 80'	Report

Ljudski vrt, Maribor
Attendance: 6,700
Referee: Euan Norris (Scotland)

Maribor won 3–1 on aggregate.

15 July 2010
20:00

Brøndby (Denmark)	3–0	(Liechtenstein) Vaduz
Nilsson 51'; Jallow 80', 85'	Report

Brøndby Stadium, Brøndbyvester
Attendance: 7,966
Referee: Kristo Tohver (Estonia)
22 July 2010
20:00

Vaduz (Liechtenstein)	0–0	(Denmark) Brøndby
	Report

Rheinpark Stadion, Vaduz
Attendance: 1,984
Referee: Mario Vlk (Slovakia)

Brøndby won 3–0 on aggregate.

15 July 2010
19:00

Stabæk (Norway)	2–2	(Belarus) Dnepr Mogilev
Skjelvik 22'; Gunnarsson 53'	Report	Turlin 14'; Kazlow 20'

Telenor Arena, Bærum
Attendance: 1,134
Referee: Andrejs Sipailo (Latvia)
22 July 2010
18:00

Dnepr Mogilev (Belarus)	1–1	(Norway) Stabæk
Yurchenko 85'	Report	Gunnarsson 37'

Spartak Stadium, Mogilev
Attendance: 4,500
Referee: Richard Trutz (Slovakia)

3–3 on aggregate; Dnepr Mogilev won on away goals.

15 July 2010
21:00

Shamrock Rovers (Republic of Ireland)	1–1	(Israel) Bnei Yehuda
Bayly 90+1'	Report	Afek 26'

Tallaght Stadium, Tallaght
Attendance: 4,850
Referee: Mauro Bergonzi (Italy)
22 July 2010
19:30

Bnei Yehuda (Israel)	0–1	(Republic of Ireland) Shamrock Rovers
	Report	Stewart 70'

Bloomfield Stadium, Tel Aviv
Attendance: 1,784
Referee: Antony Gautier (France)

Shamrock Rovers won 2–1 on aggregate.

15 July 2010
18:00

IF Elfsborg (Sweden)	2–1	(Moldova) Iskra-Stal
Keene 56'; Ericsson 79' (pen.)	Report	Tofan 87'

Borås Arena, Borås
Attendance: 3,270
Referee: Jérôme Laperriere (Switzerland)
22 July 2010
19:00

Iskra-Stal (Moldova)	0–1	(Sweden) IF Elfsborg
	Report	Ishizaki 60'

Sheriff Stadium, Tiraspol (Note: Played in Tiraspol at Sheriff Stadium as Iskra-Stal's Orăşenesc Stadium did not meet UEFA criteria.)
Attendance: 2,905
Referee: Hüseyin Göçek (Turkey)

IF Elfsborg won 3–1 on aggregate.

15 July 2010
21:15

KR (Iceland)	0–3	(Ukraine) Karpaty Lviv
	Report	Guruli 46'; Tkachuk 51'; Batista 57'

KR-völlur, Reykjavík
Attendance: 848
Referee: Michael Lerjeus (Sweden)
22 July 2010
18:15

Karpaty Lviv (Ukraine)	3–2	(Iceland) KR
Zenjov 2'; Fedetskiy 25'; Baranets 69'	Report	Finnbogason 61', 65'

Ukraina Stadium, Lviv
Attendance: 13,200
Referee: Mihaly Fabian (Hungary)

Karpaty Lviv won 6–2 on aggregate.

15 July 2010
20:00

Maccabi Tel Aviv (Israel)	2–0	(Montenegro) Mogren
Ziv 49'; Medunjanin 52'	Report

Bloomfield Stadium, Tel Aviv
Attendance: 11,178
Referee: Jérôme Efong Nzolo (Belgium)
22 July 2010
17:30

Mogren (Montenegro)	2–1	(Israel) Maccabi Tel Aviv
Gluščević 58' (pen.), 80'	Report	Medunjanin 7'

Stadion Gradski, Nikšić
Attendance: 700
Referee: Valery Vialichka (Belarus)

Maccabi Tel Aviv won 3–2 on aggregate.

15 July 2010
18:00

Austria Wien	2–2	(Bosnia and Herzegovina) Široki Brijeg
Linz 50'; Schumacher 57'	Report	Wagner 25'; Topić 54'

Franz Horr Stadium, Vienna
Attendance: 97
Referee: Artyom Kuchin (Kazakhstan)
22 July 2010
18:00

Široki Brijeg (Bosnia and Herzegovina)	0–1	Austria Wien
	Report	Junuzović 80'

Pecara Stadium, Široki Brijeg
Attendance: 4,000
Referee: César Muñiz Fernández (Spain)

Austria Wien won 3–2 on aggregate.

15 July 2010
17:00

Tauras Tauragė (Lithuania)	0–3	(Cyprus) APOEL
	Report	Charalambidis 50'; Pinto 80'; Manduca 83'

S. Darius and S. Girėnas Stadium, Kaunas
Attendance: 500
Referee: Michael Svendsen (Denmark)
22 July 2010
19:00

APOEL (Cyprus)	3–1	(Lithuania) Tauras Tauragė
Solari 18', 86' (pen.); Tričkovski 80'	Report	Irha 48'

GSP Stadium, Nicosia
Attendance: 9,632
Referee: Alexander Gvardis (Russia)

APOEL won 6–1 on aggregate.

15 July 2010
19:00

Molde (Norway)	1–0	(Latvia) Jelgava
Fall 90+1'	Report

Aker Stadion, Molde
Attendance: 2,343
Referee: Antti Munukka (Finland)
22 July 2010
18:00

Jelgava (Latvia)	2–1	(Norway) Molde
Bormakovs 30'; Bogdaškins 45+1'	Report	Fall 14'

Slokas Stadium, Jūrmala (Note: Played in Jūrmala at Slokas Stadium as Jelgava's Ozolnieku Stadions did not meet UEFA criteria.)
Attendance: 2,000
Referee: Thomas Vejlgaard (Denmark)

2–2 on aggregate; Molde won on away goals.

15 July 2010
18:00

Zestaponi (Georgia (country))	3–0	(Slovakia) Dukla Banská Bystrica
Dvali 24', 65'; Dzaria 48'	Report

David Abashidze Stadium, Zestaponi
Attendance: 3,200
Referee: Veaceslav Banari (Moldova)
22 July 2010
17:00

Dukla Banská Bystrica (Slovakia)	1–0	(Georgia (country)) Zestaponi
Ďuriš 28'	Report

SNP Stadium, Banská Bystrica
Attendance: 2,880
Referee: Dragomir Stanković (Serbia)

Zestaponi won 3–1 on aggregate.

15 July 2010
18:00

Honka (Finland)	1–1	(Wales) Bangor City
Savage 43'	Report	Jones 58'

ISS Stadion, Vantaa (Note: Played in Vantaa at ISS Stadion as Honka's Tapiolan Urheilupuisto did not meet UEFA criteria.)
Attendance: 1,279
Referee: Dimitar Meckarovski (Macedonia)
22 July 2010
20:30

Bangor City (Wales)	2–1	(Finland) Honka
Morley 85'; Jones 90+1'	Report	Koskinen 21'

Racecourse Ground, Wrexham (Note: Played in Wrexham at Racecourse Ground as Bangor City's Farrar Road Stadium did not meet UEFA criteria.)
Attendance: 954
Referee: Arman Amirkhanyan (Armenia)

Bangor City won 3–2 on aggregate.

15 July 2010
19:45

Levski Sofia (Bulgaria)	6–0	(Republic of Ireland) Dundalk
Yovov 12'; Mladenov 14', 46'; Dembélé 42'; Mustafa 86', 90+4'	Report

Georgi Asparuhov Stadium, Sofia
Attendance: 8,200
Referee: Daniele Orsato (Italy)
22 July 2010
20:00

Dundalk (Republic of Ireland)	0–2	(Bulgaria) Levski Sofia
	Report	Dembélé 4', 33'

Oriel Park, Dundalk
Attendance: 1,000
Referee: Fırat Aydınus (Turkey)

Levski Sofia won 8–0 on aggregate.

15 July 2010
16:00

WIT Georgia (Georgia (country))	0–6	(Czech Republic) Baník Ostrava
	Report	Nando 33', 56' (pen.), 64' (pen.); Pilík 61'; Neuwirth 70'; Hušbauer 78'

Boris Paichadze Stadium, Tbilisi (Note: Played in Tbilisi at Boris Paichadze Stadium as WIT Georgia's Shevardeni Stadium did not meet UEFA criteria.)
Attendance: 1,500
Referee: Babak Rafati (Germany)
22 July 2010
18:00

Baník Ostrava (Czech Republic)	0–0	(Georgia (country)) WIT Georgia
	Report

Bazaly, Ostrava
Attendance: 3,405
Referee: Boško Jovanetić (Serbia)

Baník Ostrava won 6–0 on aggregate.

15 July 2010
17:00

Rabotnicki (North Macedonia)	1–0	(Armenia) Mika
Wandeir 87'	Report

Philip II Arena, Skopje
Attendance: 1,000
Referee: Tamás Bognár (Hungary)
22 July 2010
15:00

Mika (Armenia)	0–0	(North Macedonia) Rabotnicki
	Report

Mika Stadium, Yerevan
Attendance: 5,000
Referee: Radek Příhoda (Czech Republic)

Rabotnicki won 1–0 on aggregate.

15 July 2010
16:00

Atyrau (Kazakhstan)	0–3 Awarded (Note: UEFA awarded Győri ETO a 3–0 win due to Atyrau fielding a suspended player in the first leg. The original match had ended in a 2–0 win for Győri ETO.)	(Hungary) Győri ETO
	Report	Pilibaitis 26'; Bouguerra 88'

Munayshy Stadium, Atyrau
Attendance: 6,500
Referee: Johan Verbist (Belgium)
22 July 2010
20:30

Győri ETO (Hungary)	2–0	(Kazakhstan) Atyrau
Aleksidze 47'; Nicorec 52'	Report

ETO Park, Győr
Attendance: 3,300
Referee: Sokol Jareci (Albania)

Győri ETO won 5–0 on aggregate.

15 July 2010
20:45

Portadown (Northern Ireland)	1–2	(Azerbaijan) Qarabağ
Lecky 29'	Report	Ismayilov 67', 86'

Shamrock Park, Portadown
Attendance: 765
Referee: Oliver Drachta (Austria)
22 July 2010
18:00

Qarabağ (Azerbaijan)	1–1	(Northern Ireland) Portadown
Ismayilov 83'	Report	Braniff 71'

Tofiq Bahramov Stadium, Baku
Attendance: 20,000
Referee: Tomasz Mikulski (Poland)

Qarabağ won 3–2 on aggregate.

15 July 2010
20:00

Beşiktaş (Turkey)	3–0	(Faroe Islands) Víkingur Gøta
Kahveci 19', 65'; Nobre 90'	Report

BJK İnönü Stadium, Istanbul
Attendance: 16,803
Referee: Igor Egorov (Russia)
22 July 2010
20:00

Víkingur Gøta (Faroe Islands)	0–4	(Turkey) Beşiktaş
	Report	Dağ 4'; Kahveci 10'; Bobô 32', 44'

Svangaskarð, Toftir (Note: Played in Toftir at Svangaskarð as Víkingur Gøta's Serpugerði Stadium did not meet UEFA criteria.)
Attendance: 651
Referee: Mattias Gestranius (Finland)

Beşiktaş won 7–0 on aggregate.

15 July 2010
19:30

Differdange 03 (Luxembourg)	3–3	(Serbia) Spartak Zlatibor Voda
Veselinov 6' (o.g.); Bettmer 11'; Piskor 73'	Report	Ubiparip 14'; Torbica 28' (pen.); Siebenaler 89' (o.g.)

Stade Josy Barthel, Luxembourg City (Note: Played in Luxembourg City at Stade Josy Barthel as Differdange 03's Stade du Thillenberg did not meet UEFA criteria.)
Attendance: 805
Referee: Gabriele Rossi (San Marino)
22 July 2010
17:30

Spartak Zlatibor Voda (Serbia)	2–0	(Luxembourg) Differdange 03
Ubiparip 25'; Adamović 88'	Report

Karađorđe Stadium, Novi Sad (Note: Played in Novi Sad at Karađorđe Stadium as Spartak Zlatibor Voda's Subotica City Stadium did not meet UEFA criteria.)
Attendance: 1,500
Referee: Ceri Richards (Wales)

Spartak Zlatibor Voda won 5–3 on aggregate.

15 July 2010
18:00

Dinamo Minsk (Belarus)	5–1	(Estonia) Sillamäe Kalev
Sazankow 12', 33'; Putsila 60'; Rekish 87'; Chukhley 90+2'	Report	Kolyaev 79'

Dinamo Stadium, Minsk
Attendance: 1,850
Referee: Vassilios Pamporidis (Greece)
22 July 2010
18:00

Sillamäe Kalev (Estonia)	0–5	(Belarus) Dinamo Minsk
	Report	Drahun 2'; Sazankow 17'; Chukhley 19', 65'; Rekish 46'

Lilleküla Stadium, Tallinn (Note: Played in Tallinn at Lilleküla Stadium as Sillamäe Kalev's Sillamäe Kalevi Stadium did not meet UEFA criteria.)
Attendance: 264
Referee: Ovidiu Hațegan (Romania)

Dinamo Minsk won 10–1 on aggregate.

15 July 2010
17:00

Valletta (Malta)	1–1	(Poland) Ruch Chorzów
Scerri 75'	Report	Grzyb 18' (pen.)

Centenary Stadium, Ta' Qali
Attendance: 1,149
Referee: Menashe Masiah (Israel)
22 July 2010
20:00

Ruch Chorzów (Poland)	0–0	(Malta) Valletta
	Report

Stadion Miejski, Chorzów
Attendance: 6,500
Referee: Andrea De Marco (Italy)

1–1 on aggregate; Ruch Chorzów won on away goals.

15 July 2010
18:00

Baku (Azerbaijan)	0–3 Awarded (Note: UEFA awarded Budućnost Podgorica a 3–0 win due to Baku fielding a suspended player in the first leg. The original match had ended in a 2–1 win for Baku.)	(Montenegro) Budućnost Podgorica
Kajkut 77'; Jabá 90+4'	Report	Bećiraj 38'

Tofiq Bahramov Stadium, Baku
Attendance: 15,000
Referee: Augustus Viorel Constantin (Romania)
22 July 2010
21:00

Budućnost Podgorica (Montenegro)	1–2	(Azerbaijan) Baku
Brnović 64'	Report	Šolić 28'; Jabá 42'

Stadion Pod Goricom, Podgorica
Attendance: 3,200
Referee: Dimitrios Kalopoulos (Greece)

Budućnost Podgorica won 4–2 on aggregate.

15 July 2010
20:00

Zrinjski Mostar (Bosnia and Herzegovina)	4–1	(San Marino) Tre Penne
Ivanković 1', 21' (pen.); Sušić 33'; Zadro 38'	Report	Pignieri 36'

Bijeli Brijeg Stadium, Mostar
Attendance: 3,500
Referee: Sébastien Delferiere (Belgium)
22 July 2010
20:30

Tre Penne (San Marino)	2–9	(Bosnia and Herzegovina) Zrinjski Mostar
Palazzi 28', 81'	Report	Selimović 3', 27'; Sušić 7'; Žižović 10', 55' (pen.); Zadro 52', 65'; Pehar 69'; Šunjić 87'

Stadio Olimpico, Serravalle
Attendance: 571
Referee: David Mckeon (Republic of Ireland)

Zrinjski Mostar won 13–3 on aggregate.

15 July 2010
19:00

Gefle IF (Sweden)	1–2	(Georgia (country)) Dinamo Tbilisi
Berggren 51' (pen.)	Report	Vatsadze 11'; Khmaladze 87' (pen.)

Råsunda Stadium, Solna
Attendance: 500
Referee: Damir Batinić (Croatia)
22 July 2010
18:45

Dinamo Tbilisi (Georgia (country))	2–1	(Sweden) Gefle IF
Vatsadze 30'; Pirtskhalava 82'	Report	Orlov 90+1'

Boris Paichadze Stadium, Tbilisi
Attendance: 2,500
Referee: Nikolay Yordanov (Bulgaria)

Dinamo Tbilisi won 4–2 on aggregate.

15 July 2010
20:45

Cliftonville (Northern Ireland)	1–0	(Croatia) Cibalia
Caldwell 82'	Report

Windsor Park, Belfast (Note: Played in Belfast at Windsor Park as Cliftonville's Solitude did not meet UEFA criteria.)
Attendance: 755
Referee: Stanislav Todorov (Bulgaria)
22 July 2010
20:45

Cibalia (Croatia)	0–0	(Northern Ireland) Cliftonville
	Report

Stadion HNK Cibalia, Vinkovci
Attendance: 5,200
Referee: Clément Turpin (France)

Cliftonville won 1–0 on aggregate.

15 July 2010
20:30

Besa (Albania)	0–5	(Greece) Olympiacos
	Report	Óscar 19', 30'; Dudu 46'; Diogo 70', 82'

Qemal Stafa Stadium, Tirana (Note: Played in Tirana at Qemal Stafa Stadium as Besa's Stadiumi Besa did not meet UEFA criteria.)
Attendance: 5,000
Referee: Richard Liesveld (Netherlands)
22 July 2010
20:30

Olympiacos (Greece)	6–1	(Albania) Besa
Dudu 46', 79'; Derbyshire 53'; Maresca 75', 90'; Fetfatzidis 88'	Report	Lazarevski 48'

Karaiskakis Stadium, Piraeus
Attendance: 0
Referee: Lee Probert (England)

Olympiacos won 11–1 on aggregate.
