= 2010–11 UEFA Europa League qualifying =

Football tournament qualification stage

This article details the 2010–11 UEFA Europa League qualifying phase and play-off round.

All times are CEST (UTC+2), as listed by UEFA.

== Format ==
Each tie was played over two legs, with each team playing one leg at home. The team that had the higher aggregate score over the two legs progressed to the next round. In the event that aggregate scores finished level, the away goals rule was applied; i.e., the team that scored more goals away from home over the two legs progressed. If away goals were also equal, then 30 minutes of extra time were played, divided into two 15-minute halves. The away goals rule was again applied after extra time; i.e., if there were goals scored during extra time and the aggregate score was still level, the visiting team qualified by virtue of more away goals scored. If no goals were scored during extra time, the tie was decided by a penalty shoot-out.

== Round and draw dates ==
All draws were held at UEFA headquarters in Nyon, Switzerland.

Phase	Round	Draw date and time	First leg	Second leg
Qualifying	First qualifying round	21 June 2010, 13:00 CEST	1 July 2010	8 July 2010
Qualifying	Second qualifying round	21 June 2010, 13:00 CEST	15 July 2010	22 July 2010
Qualifying	Third qualifying round	16 July 2010, 13:30 CEST	29 July 2010	5 August 2010
Play-off	Play-off round	6 August 2010, 13:30 CEST	19 August 2010	26 August 2010

Matches may also be played on Tuesdays or Wednesdays instead of the regular Thursdays due to scheduling conflicts.

== Teams ==
Below are the 160 teams involved in the qualifying phase and play-off round, grouped by their starting rounds. The 37 winners of the play-off round qualified for the group stage to join the 10 losing teams from the Champions League play-off round, and the title holders, Atlético Madrid.

In each round, teams were seeded based on their 2010 UEFA club coefficients. Prior to the draw, UEFA could form "groups" in accordance with the principles set by the Club Competitions Committee, but they were purely for convenience of the draw and did not resemble any real groupings in the sense of the competition, while ensuring that teams from the same association were not drawn against each other.

Key to colours
Qualified for the group stage

Play-off round
Team	Coeff.
(Portugal) Porto	76.659
(Spain) Villarreal	70.951
(Russia) CSKA Moscow	66.758
(Netherlands) PSV Eindhoven	66.309
(Turkey) Fenerbahçe	54.890
(Romania) Steaua București	47.898
(France) Lille	46.748
(Germany) Bayer Leverkusen	40.841
(France) Paris Saint-Germain	39.748
(Scotland) Celtic	38.158
(Belgium) Club Brugge	36.580
(Italy) Palermo	35.867
(Spain) Getafe	33.951
(England) Manchester City	33.371
(Greece) AEK Athens	25.979
(England) Aston Villa	25.871
(Russia) Lokomotiv Moscow	25.758
(Ukraine) Metalist Kharkiv	25.410
(Romania) Unirea Urziceni	18.898
(Netherlands) Feyenoord	16.309
(Bulgaria) Litex Lovech	15.900
(Italy) Napoli	14.867
(Germany) Borussia Dortmund	14.841
(Croatia) Dinamo Zagreb	14.466
(Belarus) BATE Borisov	13.308
(Switzerland) Grasshopper	12.675
(Greece) PAOK	11.479
(Romania) Vaslui	11.398
(Poland) Lech Poznań	11.008
(Turkey) Trabzonspor	10.390
(Ukraine) Tavriya Simferopol	7.910
(Belgium) Gent	6.580
(Hungary) Debrecen	5.350
(Scotland) Dundee United	5.158
(Cyprus) Omonia	4.599
(Sweden) AIK	3.838
(Kazakhstan) Aktobe	2.399
(Finland) HJK	2.399
(Wales) The New Saints	0.766

Third qualifying round
Team	Coeff.
(England) Liverpool	115.371
(Italy) Juventus	59.867
(Portugal) Sporting CP	57.659
(Germany) VfB Stuttgart	52.841
(Netherlands) AZ	48.309
(Turkey) Galatasaray	43.890
(Israel) Maccabi Haifa	19.775
(Bulgaria) CSKA Sofia	15.400
(Denmark) Odense	14.970
(Ukraine) Dnipro Dnipropetrovsk	14.910
(Serbia) Red Star Belgrade	13.300
(Greece) Aris	12.979
(Romania) Timișoara	11.898
(France) Montpellier	10.748
(Russia) Sibir Novosibirsk	8.758
(Belgium) Genk	8.080
(Austria) Sturm Graz	6.915
(Scotland) Hibernian	6.158
(Switzerland) Luzern	5.675
(Denmark) Nordsjælland	5.470
(Slovakia) Slovan Bratislava	4.666
(Bulgaria) Beroe Stara Zagora	4.400
(Czech Republic) Viktoria Plzeň	4.395
(Czech Republic) Jablonec	4.395
(Sweden) IFK Göteborg	3.838
(Cyprus) Apollon Limassol	3.599
(Norway) Aalesund	3.480
(Croatia) Hajduk Split	3.466
(Finland) Inter Turku	2.899
(Poland) Jagiellonia Białystok	2.508

Second qualifying round
Team	Coeff.
(Greece) Olympiacos	54.979
(Turkey) Beşiktaş	33.890
(Romania) Dinamo București	28.898
(Bulgaria) Levski Sofia	25.400
Austria Wien	16.915
(Denmark) Brøndby	12.970
(Austria) Rapid Wien	11.915
(Cyprus) APOEL	11.599
(Poland) Wisła Kraków	8.508
(Ukraine) Karpaty Lviv	7.910
(Portugal) Marítimo	7.659
(Czech Republic) Baník Ostrava	7.395
(Sweden) IF Elfsborg	7.338
(Netherlands) Utrecht	7.309
(Scotland) Motherwell	6.158
(Switzerland) Lausanne-Sport	5.675
(Belgium) Cercle Brugge	5.580
(Norway) Stabæk	4.980
(Latvia) Ventspils	4.649
(Norway) Molde	4.480
(Israel) Maccabi Tel Aviv	3.775
(Slovakia) Dukla Banská Bystrica	3.166
(Finland) Honka	2.899
(Slovenia) Maribor	2.891
(Belarus) Dinamo Minsk	2.808
(Serbia) OFK Beograd	2.800
(Serbia) Spartak Zlatibor Voda	2.800
(Azerbaijan) Baku	2.599
(Croatia) Cibalia	2.466
(Lithuania) Sūduva	2.183
(Georgia (country)) WIT Georgia	2.149
(Moldova) Iskra-Stal	1.958
(Republic of Ireland) Sporting Fingal	1.908
(Republic of Ireland) Shamrock Rovers	1.908
(Liechtenstein) Vaduz	1.900
(Slovenia) HIT Gorica	1.891
(Bosnia and Herzegovina) Borac Banja Luka	1.749
(Lithuania) Šiauliai	1.683
(Latvia) Jelgava	1.649
(Hungary) Videoton	1.350
(Andorra) Sant Julià	1.200
(Iceland) Breiðablik	1.083
(North Macedonia) Teteks	1.066
(Wales) Bangor City	1.016
(Kazakhstan) Atyrau	0.899
(Estonia) Sillamäe Kalev	0.874
(Armenia) Mika	0.849
(Albania) Besa	0.799
(Luxembourg) Differdange 03	0.749
(Malta) Valletta	0.683
(Montenegro) Budućnost Podgorica	0.675
(Faroe Islands) Víkingur Gøta	0.366
(Northern Ireland) Cliftonville	0.324
(San Marino) Tre Penne	0.150

First qualifying round
Team	Coeff.
(Cyprus) Anorthosis Famagusta	13.099
(Denmark) Randers	6.470
(Sweden) Kalmar FF	5.838
(Israel) Bnei Yehuda	5.275
(Slovakia) Nitra	3.166
(North Macedonia) Rabotnicki	3.066
(Finland) MYPA	2.899
(Sweden) Gefle IF	2.838
(Bosnia and Herzegovina) Zrinjski Mostar	2.749
(Azerbaijan) Qarabağ	2.599
(Poland) Ruch Chorzów	2.508
(Croatia) Šibenik	2.466
(Belarus) Dnepr Mogilev	2.308
(Belarus) Torpedo Zhodino	2.308
(Bosnia and Herzegovina) Široki Brijeg	2.249
(Latvia) Skonto	2.149
(Georgia (country)) Dinamo Tbilisi	2.149
(Iceland) KR	2.083
(Moldova) Dacia Chișinău	1.958
(Republic of Ireland) Dundalk	1.908
(Finland) TPS	1.899
(Albania) Tirana	1.799
(Lithuania) Tauras Tauragė	1.683
(Georgia (country)) Zestaponi	1.649
(Moldova) Olimpia Bălți	1.458
(Montenegro) Mogren	1.425
(Kazakhstan) Tobol	1.399
(Slovenia) Olimpija Ljubljana	1.391
(Estonia) Flora	1.374
(Faroe Islands) EB/Streymur	1.366
(Hungary) Győri ETO	1.350
(Hungary) Zalaegerszeg	1.350
(Northern Ireland) Glentoran	1.324
(Luxembourg) F91 Dudelange	1.249
(Estonia) Narva Trans	1.124
(Azerbaijan) Khazar Lankaran	1.099
(Iceland) Fylkir	1.083
(North Macedonia) Metalurg Skopje	1.066
(Kazakhstan) Shakhter Karagandy	0.899
(Armenia) Banants	0.849
(Albania) Laçi	0.799
(Wales) Llanelli	0.766
(Malta) Sliema Wanderers	0.683
(Faroe Islands) NSÍ	0.616
(Armenia) Ulisses	0.599
(Wales) Port Talbot Town	0.516
(Luxembourg) Grevenmacher	0.499
(Montenegro) Zeta	0.425
(Northern Ireland) Portadown	0.324
(Andorra) UE Santa Coloma	0.200
(Andorra) Lusitanos	0.200
(San Marino) Faetano	0.150

Notes

1. ^{CL-CP} Losing teams from the Champions League third qualifying round (Champions Path)
2. ^{CL-NCP} Losing teams from the Champions League third qualifying round (Non-Champions Path)

== First qualifying round ==
=== Seeding ===
Group 1		Group 2		Group 3	
Seeded	Unseeded	Seeded	Unseeded	Seeded	Unseeded
(Cyprus) Anorthosis Famagusta (Croatia) Šibenik (Bosnia and Herzegovina) Široki Brijeg (Moldova) Olimpia Bălți (Montenegro) Mogren	(Slovenia) Olimpija Ljubljana (Azerbaijan) Khazar Lankaran (Armenia) Banants (Malta) Sliema Wanderers (Andorra) UE Santa Coloma	(Israel) Bnei Yehuda (North Macedonia) Rabotnicki (Bosnia and Herzegovina) Zrinjski Mostar (Albania) Tirana (Georgia (country)) Zestaponi	(Kazakhstan) Tobol (Hungary) Zalaegerszeg (Armenia) Ulisses (Andorra) Lusitanos (San Marino) Faetano	(Denmark) Randers (Sweden) Gefle IF (Belarus) Torpedo Zhodino (Latvia) Skonto (Finland) TPS	(Luxembourg) F91 Dudelange (Iceland) Fylkir (Faroe Islands) NSÍ (Wales) Port Talbot Town (Northern Ireland) Portadown
Group 4		Group 5			
Seeded	Unseeded	Seeded	Unseeded		
(Sweden) Kalmar FF (Finland) MYPA (Iceland) KR (Republic of Ireland) Dundalk (Lithuania) Tauras Tauragė	(Faroe Islands) EB/Streymur (Northern Ireland) Glentoran (Estonia) Narva Trans (Wales) Llanelli (Luxembourg) Grevenmacher	(Slovakia) Nitra (Azerbaijan) Qarabağ (Poland) Ruch Chorzów (Belarus) Dnepr Mogilev (Georgia (country)) Dinamo Tbilisi (Moldova) Dacia Chișinău	(Estonia) Flora (Hungary) Győri ETO (North Macedonia) Metalurg Skopje (Kazakhstan) Shakhter Karagandy (Albania) Laçi (Montenegro) Zeta		

=== Summary ===
The first legs were played on 1 July, and the second legs were played on 8 July 2010.

Team 1	Agg.	Team 2	1st leg	2nd leg
UE Santa Coloma (Andorra)	0–5	(Montenegro) Mogren	0–3	0–2
Olimpija Ljubljana (Slovenia)	0–5	(Bosnia and Herzegovina) Široki Brijeg	0–2	0–3
Anorthosis Famagusta (Cyprus)	4–0	(Armenia) Banants	3–0	1–0
Olimpia Bălți (Moldova)	1–1 (a) (Note: Order of legs reversed after original draw.)	(Azerbaijan) Khazar Lankaran	0–0	1–1
Šibenik (Croatia)	3–0	(Malta) Sliema Wanderers	0–0	3–0
Tobol (Kazakhstan)	2–4	(Bosnia and Herzegovina) Zrinjski Mostar	1–2	1–2
Ulisses (Armenia)	0–1	(Israel) Bnei Yehuda	0–0	0–1
Rabotnicki (North Macedonia)	11–0	(Andorra) Lusitanos	5–0	6–0
Tirana (Albania)	1–0	(Hungary) Zalaegerszeg	0–0	1–0 (a.e.t.)
Zestaponi (Georgia (country))	5–0	(San Marino) Faetano	5–0	0–0
NSÍ (Faroe Islands)	1–4	(Sweden) Gefle IF	0–2	1–2
Torpedo Zhodino (Belarus)	6–1	(Iceland) Fylkir	3–0	3–1
Randers (Denmark)	7–3	(Luxembourg) F91 Dudelange	6–1	1–2
Portadown (Northern Ireland)	2–1	(Latvia) Skonto	1–1	1–0
TPS (Finland)	7–1	(Wales) Port Talbot Town	3–1	4–0
KR (Iceland)	5–2	(Northern Ireland) Glentoran	3–0	2–2
Grevenmacher (Luxembourg)	4–5	(Republic of Ireland) Dundalk	3–3	1–2
Kalmar FF (Sweden)	4–0	(Faroe Islands) EB/Streymur	1–0	3–0
Llanelli (Wales)	4–5	(Lithuania) Tauras Tauragė	2–2	2–3 (a.e.t.)
Narva Trans (Estonia)	0–7	(Finland) MYPA	0–2	0–5
Zeta (Montenegro)	1–1 (a)	(Moldova) Dacia Chișinău	1–1	0–0
Laçi (Albania)	2–8	(Belarus) Dnepr Mogilev	1–1	1–7
Shakhter Karagandy (Kazakhstan)	1–3	(Poland) Ruch Chorzów	1–2	0–1
Dinamo Tbilisi (Georgia (country))	2–1	(Estonia) Flora	2–1	0–0
Nitra (Slovakia)	3–5	(Hungary) Győri ETO	2–2	1–3
Qarabağ (Azerbaijan)	5–2	(North Macedonia) Metalurg Skopje	4–1	1–1

== Second qualifying round ==
=== Seeding ===
Group 1		Group 2		Group 3		Group 4	
Seeded	Unseeded	Seeded	Unseeded	Seeded	Unseeded	Seeded	Unseeded
(Cyprus) Anorthosis Famagusta (Poland) Wisła Kraków (Scotland) Motherwell (Switzerland) Lausanne-Sport (Belgium) Cercle Brugge	(Croatia) Šibenik (Finland) TPS (Bosnia and Herzegovina) Borac Banja Luka (Lithuania) Šiauliai (Iceland) Breiðablik	(Austria) Rapid Wien (Portugal) Marítimo (Netherlands) Utrecht (Denmark) Randers (Sweden) Kalmar FF	(Lithuania) Sūduva (Moldova) Dacia Chișinău (Republic of Ireland) Sporting Fingal (Slovenia) HIT Gorica (Albania) Tirana	(Romania) Dinamo București (Latvia) Ventspils (Finland) MYPA (Slovenia) Maribor (Serbia) OFK Beograd	(Belarus) Torpedo Zhodino (Moldova) Olimpia Bălți (Hungary) Videoton (Andorra) Sant Julià (North Macedonia) Teteks	(Denmark) Brøndby (Ukraine) Karpaty Lviv (Sweden) IF Elfsborg (Israel) Bnei Yehuda (Norway) Stabæk	(Belarus) Dnepr Mogilev (Iceland) KR (Moldova) Iskra-Stal (Republic of Ireland) Shamrock Rovers (Liechtenstein) Vaduz
Group 5		Group 6		Group 7		Group 8	
Seeded	Unseeded	Seeded	Unseeded	Seeded	Unseeded	Seeded	Unseeded
Austria Wien (Cyprus) APOEL (Norway) Molde (Israel) Maccabi Tel Aviv (Slovakia) Dukla Banská Bystrica	(Bosnia and Herzegovina) Široki Brijeg (Lithuania) Tauras Tauragė (Georgia (country)) Zestaponi (Latvia) Jelgava (Montenegro) Mogren	(Bulgaria) Levski Sofia (Czech Republic) Baník Ostrava (Hungary) Győri ETO (North Macedonia) Rabotnicki (Finland) Honka	(Georgia (country)) WIT Georgia (Republic of Ireland) Dundalk (Wales) Bangor City (Kazakhstan) Atyrau (Armenia) Mika	(Turkey) Beşiktaş (Belarus) Dinamo Minsk (Serbia) Spartak Zlatibor Voda (Azerbaijan) Qarabağ (Poland) Ruch Chorzów	(Northern Ireland) Portadown (Estonia) Sillamäe Kalev (Luxembourg) Differdange 03 (Malta) Valletta (Faroe Islands) Víkingur Gøta	(Greece) Olympiacos (Sweden) Gefle IF (Bosnia and Herzegovina) Zrinjski Mostar (Azerbaijan) Baku (Croatia) Cibalia	(Georgia (country)) Dinamo Tbilisi (Albania) Besa (Montenegro) Budućnost Podgorica (Northern Ireland) Cliftonville (San Marino) Tre Penne

Notes

1. ^{†} Winners of the first qualifying round, whose identity was not known at the time of draw. Teams in italics defeated a team with a higher coefficient, thus effectively taking the coefficient of their opponent in the draw.

=== Summary ===
The first legs were played on 15 July, and the second legs were played on 22 and 23 July 2010.

Team 1	Agg.	Team 2	1st leg	2nd leg
Cercle Brugge (Belgium)	2–2 (a)	(Finland) TPS	0–1	2–1
Motherwell (Scotland)	2–0	(Iceland) Breiðablik	1–0	1–0
Anorthosis Famagusta (Cyprus)	3–2 (Note: Order of legs reversed after original draw.)	(Croatia) Šibenik	0–2	3–0 (a.e.t.)
Lausanne-Sport (Switzerland)	2–1	(Bosnia and Herzegovina) Borac Banja Luka	1–0	1–1
Šiauliai (Lithuania)	0–7	(Poland) Wisła Kraków	0–2	0–5
Kalmar FF (Sweden)	2–0	(Moldova) Dacia Chișinău	0–0	2–0
Utrecht (Netherlands)	5–1	(Albania) Tirana	4–0	1–1
HIT Gorica (Slovenia)	1–4	(Denmark) Randers	0–3	1–1
Marítimo (Portugal)	6–4	(Republic of Ireland) Sporting Fingal	3–2	3–2
Sūduva (Lithuania)	2–6	(Austria) Rapid Wien	0–2	2–4
Ventspils (Latvia)	1–3	(North Macedonia) Teteks	0–0	1–3
OFK Beograd (Serbia)	3–2	(Belarus) Torpedo Zhodino	2–2	1–0
Olimpia Bălți (Moldova)	1–7	(Romania) Dinamo București	0–2	1–5
MYPA (Finland)	8–0	(Andorra) Sant Julià	3–0	5–0 (Note: Original match abandoned in the 80th minute due to adverse weather conditions, with MYPA leading 1–0. The match was replayed on 23 July 2010 at 18:30 CEST from the beginning.)
Videoton (Hungary)	1–3	(Slovenia) Maribor	1–1	0–2
Brøndby (Denmark)	3–0	(Liechtenstein) Vaduz	3–0	0–0
Stabæk (Norway)	3–3 (a)	(Belarus) Dnepr Mogilev	2–2	1–1
Shamrock Rovers (Republic of Ireland)	2–1	(Israel) Bnei Yehuda	1–1	1–0
IF Elfsborg (Sweden)	3–1	(Moldova) Iskra-Stal	2–1	1–0
KR (Iceland)	2–6	(Ukraine) Karpaty Lviv	0–3	2–3
Maccabi Tel Aviv (Israel)	3–2	(Montenegro) Mogren	2–0	1–2
Austria Wien	3–2	(Bosnia and Herzegovina) Široki Brijeg	2–2	1–0
Tauras Tauragė (Lithuania)	1–6	(Cyprus) APOEL	0–3	1–3
Molde (Norway)	2–2 (a)	(Latvia) Jelgava	1–0	1–2
Zestaponi (Georgia (country))	3–1	(Slovakia) Dukla Banská Bystrica	3–0	0–1
Honka (Finland)	2–3	(Wales) Bangor City	1–1	1–2
Levski Sofia (Bulgaria)	8–0	(Republic of Ireland) Dundalk	6–0	2–0
WIT Georgia (Georgia (country))	0–6	(Czech Republic) Baník Ostrava	0–6	0–0
Rabotnicki (North Macedonia)	1–0	(Armenia) Mika	1–0	0–0
Atyrau (Kazakhstan)	0–5	(Hungary) Győri ETO	0–3 (Note: UEFA awarded Győri ETO a 3–0 win due to Atyrau fielding a suspended player in the first leg. The original match had ended in a 2–0 win for Győri ETO.)	0–2
Portadown (Northern Ireland)	2–3	(Azerbaijan) Qarabağ	1–2	1–1
Beşiktaş (Turkey)	7–0	(Faroe Islands) Víkingur Gøta	3–0	4–0
Differdange 03 (Luxembourg)	3–5	(Serbia) Spartak Zlatibor Voda	3–3	0–2
Dinamo Minsk (Belarus)	10–1	(Estonia) Sillamäe Kalev	5–1	5–0
Valletta (Malta)	1–1 (a)	(Poland) Ruch Chorzów	1–1	0–0
Baku (Azerbaijan)	2–4	(Montenegro) Budućnost Podgorica	0–3 (Note: UEFA awarded Budućnost Podgorica a 3–0 win due to Baku fielding a suspended player in the first leg. The original match had ended in a 2–1 win for Baku.)	2–1
Zrinjski Mostar (Bosnia and Herzegovina)	13–3	(San Marino) Tre Penne	4–1	9–2
Gefle IF (Sweden)	2–4	(Georgia (country)) Dinamo Tbilisi	1–2	1–2
Cliftonville (Northern Ireland)	1–0	(Croatia) Cibalia	1–0	0–0
Besa (Albania)	1–11	(Greece) Olympiacos	0–5	1–6

== Third qualifying round ==
=== Seeding ===
Group 1		Group 2		Group 3		Group 4	
Seeded	Unseeded	Seeded	Unseeded	Seeded	Unseeded	Seeded	Unseeded
(England) Liverpool (Denmark) Odense (Austria) Rapid Wien (Portugal) Marítimo (Czech Republic) Baník Ostrava	(Belarus) Dnepr Mogilev (Bulgaria) Beroe Stara Zagora (North Macedonia) Rabotnicki (Wales) Bangor City (Bosnia and Herzegovina) Zrinjski Mostar	(Italy) Juventus (Bulgaria) CSKA Sofia (Romania) Timișoara (Ukraine) Karpaty Lviv (Sweden) IF Elfsborg	(Republic of Ireland) Shamrock Rovers (North Macedonia) Teteks (Georgia (country)) Zestaponi (Finland) MYPA (Northern Ireland) Cliftonville	(Portugal) Sporting CP; Austria Wien (Serbia) Red Star Belgrade (Belgium) Genk (Scotland) Hibernian	(Denmark) Nordsjælland (Slovakia) Slovan Bratislava (Finland) Inter Turku (Slovenia) Maribor (Poland) Ruch Chorzów	(Greece) Olympiacos (Turkey) Beşiktaş (Cyprus) Anorthosis Famagusta (Poland) Wisła Kraków (Austria) Sturm Graz	(Belgium) Cercle Brugge (Czech Republic) Viktoria Plzeň (Israel) Maccabi Tel Aviv (Georgia (country)) Dinamo Tbilisi (Azerbaijan) Qarabağ
Group 5		Group 6		Group 7			
Seeded	Unseeded	Seeded	Unseeded	Seeded	Unseeded		
(Germany) VfB Stuttgart (Israel) Maccabi Haifa (Denmark) Brøndby (Russia) Sibir Novosibirsk (Netherlands) Utrecht	(Switzerland) Luzern (Norway) Molde (Cyprus) Apollon Limassol (Belarus) Dinamo Minsk (Montenegro) Budućnost Podgorica	(Netherlands) AZ (Romania) Dinamo București (Ukraine) Dnipro Dnipropetrovsk (France) Montpellier (Denmark) Randers	(Switzerland) Lausanne-Sport (Sweden) IFK Göteborg (Croatia) Hajduk Split (Serbia) Spartak Zlatibor Voda (Hungary) Győri ETO	(Turkey) Galatasaray (Bulgaria) Levski Sofia (Greece) Aris (Cyprus) APOEL (Scotland) Motherwell	(Sweden) Kalmar FF (Czech Republic) Jablonec (Norway) Aalesund (Serbia) OFK Beograd (Poland) Jagiellonia Białystok		

Notes

1. ^{†} Winners of the second qualifying round, whose identity was not known at the time of draw. Teams in italics defeated a team with a higher coefficient, thus effectively taking the coefficient of their opponent in the draw.

=== Summary ===
The first legs were played on 27 and 29 July, and the second legs were played on 3 and 5 August 2010.

Team 1	Agg.	Team 2	1st leg	2nd leg
Odense (Denmark)	5–3	(Bosnia and Herzegovina) Zrinjski Mostar	5–3	0–0
Dnepr Mogilev (Belarus)	3–1	(Czech Republic) Baník Ostrava	1–0	2–1
Rabotnicki (North Macedonia)	0–4 (Note: Order of legs reversed after original draw.)	(England) Liverpool	0–2	0–2
Marítimo (Portugal)	10–3	(Wales) Bangor City	8–2	2–1
Beroe Stara Zagora (Bulgaria)	1–4	(Austria) Rapid Wien	1–1	0–3
MYPA (Finland)	4–5	(Romania) Timișoara	1–2	3–3
CSKA Sofia (Bulgaria)	5–1	(Northern Ireland) Cliftonville	3–0	2–1
Karpaty Lviv (Ukraine)	2–0	(Georgia (country)) Zestaponi	1–0	1–0
Shamrock Rovers (Republic of Ireland)	0–3	(Italy) Juventus	0–2	0–1
IF Elfsborg (Sweden)	7–1	(North Macedonia) Teteks	5–0	2–1
Nordsjælland (Denmark)	1–3	(Portugal) Sporting CP	0–1	1–2
Maribor (Slovenia)	6–2	(Scotland) Hibernian	3–0	3–2
Red Star Belgrade (Serbia)	2–3	(Slovakia) Slovan Bratislava	1–2	1–1
Inter Turku (Finland)	3–8	(Belgium) Genk	1–5	2–3
Ruch Chorzów (Poland)	1–6	Austria Wien	1–3	0–3
Viktoria Plzeň (Czech Republic)	1–4	(Turkey) Beşiktaş	1–1	0–3
Olympiacos (Greece)	2–2 (a)	(Israel) Maccabi Tel Aviv	2–1	0–1
Wisła Kraków (Poland)	2–4	(Azerbaijan) Qarabağ	0–1	2–3
Sturm Graz (Austria)	3–1	(Georgia (country)) Dinamo Tbilisi	2–0	1–1
Cercle Brugge (Belgium)	2–3	(Cyprus) Anorthosis Famagusta	1–0	1–3
Budućnost Podgorica (Montenegro)	1–3	(Denmark) Brøndby	1–2	0–1
Molde (Norway)	4–5	(Germany) VfB Stuttgart	2–3	2–2
Maccabi Haifa (Israel)	2–3	(Belarus) Dinamo Minsk	1–0	1–3
Utrecht (Netherlands)	4–1	(Switzerland) Luzern	1–0	3–1
Sibir Novosibirsk (Russia)	2–2 (a)	(Cyprus) Apollon Limassol	1–0	1–2
Randers (Denmark)	3–4	(Switzerland) Lausanne-Sport	2–3	1–1
Dinamo București (Romania)	3–4	(Croatia) Hajduk Split	3–1	0–3
AZ (Netherlands)	2–1	(Sweden) IFK Göteborg	2–0	0–1
Spartak Zlatibor Voda (Serbia)	2–3	(Ukraine) Dnipro Dnipropetrovsk	2–1	0–2
Győri ETO (Hungary)	1–1 (4–3 p)	(France) Montpellier	0–1	1–0 (a.e.t.)
Aalesund (Norway)	1–4	(Scotland) Motherwell	1–1	0–3
Kalmar FF (Sweden)	3–6	(Bulgaria) Levski Sofia	1–1	2–5
Galatasaray (Turkey)	7–3	(Serbia) OFK Beograd	2–2	5–1
Jagiellonia Białystok (Poland)	3–4	(Greece) Aris	1–2	2–2
APOEL (Cyprus)	4–1	(Czech Republic) Jablonec	1–0	3–1

== Play-off round ==
=== Seeding ===
Group 1		Group 2		Group 3		Group 4	
Seeded	Unseeded	Seeded	Unseeded	Seeded	Unseeded	Seeded	Unseeded
(Russia) CSKA Moscow (Germany) Bayer Leverkusen (France) Paris Saint-Germain (Romania) Unirea Urziceni (Netherlands) Feyenoord	(Cyprus) Anorthosis Famagusta (Ukraine) Tavriya Simferopol (Belgium) Gent (Israel) Maccabi Tel Aviv (Croatia) Hajduk Split	(Portugal) Porto (Turkey) Galatasaray (Italy) Palermo; Austria Wien (Bulgaria) Litex Lovech	(Greece) Aris (Belgium) Genk (Ukraine) Karpaty Lviv (Hungary) Debrecen (Slovenia) Maribor	(Portugal) Sporting CP (France) Lille (Belgium) Club Brugge (Ukraine) Metalist Kharkiv (Italy) Napoli	(Denmark) Brøndby (Romania) Vaslui (Sweden) IF Elfsborg (Cyprus) Omonia (Belarus) Dinamo Minsk	(England) Liverpool (Romania) Steaua București (Scotland) Celtic (Bulgaria) Levski Sofia (Germany) Borussia Dortmund	(Switzerland) Grasshopper (Turkey) Trabzonspor (Netherlands) Utrecht (Sweden) AIK (Azerbaijan) Qarabağ
Group 5		Group 6		Group 7			
Seeded	Unseeded	Seeded	Unseeded	Seeded	Unseeded		
(Italy) Juventus (Netherlands) AZ (Spain) Getafe (Greece) AEK Athens (Ukraine) Dnipro Dnipropetrovsk	(Cyprus) APOEL (Poland) Lech Poznań (Austria) Sturm Graz (Scotland) Dundee United (Kazakhstan) Aktobe	(Netherlands) PSV Eindhoven (Germany) VfB Stuttgart (Turkey) Beşiktaş (England) Aston Villa (Bulgaria) CSKA Sofia (Belarus) BATE Borisov	(Austria) Rapid Wien (Russia) Sibir Novosibirsk (Portugal) Marítimo (Slovakia) Slovan Bratislava (Finland) HJK (Wales) The New Saints	(Spain) Villarreal (Turkey) Fenerbahçe (England) Manchester City (Russia) Lokomotiv Moscow (Denmark) Odense (Croatia) Dinamo Zagreb	(Romania) Timișoara (Greece) PAOK (Scotland) Motherwell (Switzerland) Lausanne-Sport (Belarus) Dnepr Mogilev (Hungary) Győri ETO		

=== Summary ===
The first legs were played on 17 and 19 August, and the second legs were played on 24 and 26 August 2010.

Team 1	Agg.	Team 2	1st leg	2nd leg
Paris Saint-Germain (France)	5–4	(Israel) Maccabi Tel Aviv	2–0	3–4
Bayer Leverkusen (Germany)	6–1	(Ukraine) Tavriya Simferopol	3–0	3–1
CSKA Moscow (Russia)	6–1	(Cyprus) Anorthosis Famagusta	4–0	2–1
Hajduk Split (Croatia)	5–2	(Romania) Unirea Urziceni	4–1	1–1
Feyenoord (Netherlands)	1–2	(Belgium) Gent	1–0	0–2
Genk (Belgium)	2–7	(Portugal) Porto	0–3	2–4
Debrecen (Hungary)	4–1	(Bulgaria) Litex Lovech	2–0	2–1
Aris (Greece)	2–1	Austria Wien	1–0	1–1
Galatasaray (Turkey)	3–3 (a)	(Ukraine) Karpaty Lviv	2–2	1–1
Palermo (Italy)	5–3	(Slovenia) Maribor	3–0	2–3
Club Brugge (Belgium)	5–3	(Belarus) Dinamo Minsk	2–1	3–2
Omonia (Cyprus)	2–3	(Ukraine) Metalist Kharkiv	0–1	2–2
Vaslui (Romania)	0–2	(France) Lille	0–0	0–2
Napoli (Italy)	3–0	(Sweden) IF Elfsborg	1–0	2–0
Sporting CP (Portugal)	3–2	(Denmark) Brøndby	0–2	3–0
Steaua București (Romania)	1–1 (4–3 p) (Note: Order of legs reversed after original draw.)	(Switzerland) Grasshopper	1–0	0–1 (a.e.t.)
Liverpool (England)	3–1	(Turkey) Trabzonspor	1–0	2–1
Celtic (Scotland)	2–4	(Netherlands) Utrecht	2–0	0–4
Borussia Dortmund (Germany)	5–0	(Azerbaijan) Qarabağ	4–0	1–0
AIK (Sweden)	1–2	(Bulgaria) Levski Sofia	0–0	1–2
Sturm Graz (Austria)	1–3	(Italy) Juventus	1–2	0–1
Getafe (Spain)	2–1	(Cyprus) APOEL	1–0	1–1 (a.e.t.)
Dundee United (Scotland)	1–2	(Greece) AEK Athens	0–1	1–1
AZ (Netherlands)	3–2	(Kazakhstan) Aktobe	2–0	1–2
Dnipro Dnipropetrovsk (Ukraine)	0–1	(Poland) Lech Poznań	0–1	0–0
Rapid Wien (Austria)	4–3	(England) Aston Villa	1–1	3–2
CSKA Sofia (Bulgaria)	5–2	(Wales) The New Saints	3–0	2–2
Beşiktaş (Turkey)	6–0	(Finland) HJK	2–0	4–0
Slovan Bratislava (Slovakia)	2–3	(Germany) VfB Stuttgart	0–1	2–2
Sibir Novosibirsk (Russia)	1–5	(Netherlands) PSV Eindhoven	1–0	0–5
BATE Borisov (Belarus)	5–1	(Portugal) Marítimo	3–0	2–1
Lausanne-Sport (Switzerland)	2–2 (4–3 p)	(Russia) Lokomotiv Moscow	1–1	1–1 (a.e.t.)
Győri ETO (Hungary)	1–4	(Croatia) Dinamo Zagreb	0–2	1–2
Odense (Denmark)	3–1	(Scotland) Motherwell	2–1	1–0
PAOK (Greece)	2–1	(Turkey) Fenerbahçe	1–0	1–1 (a.e.t.)
Villarreal (Spain)	7–1	(Belarus) Dnepr Mogilev	5–0	2–1
Timișoara (Romania)	0–3	(England) Manchester City	0–1	0–2
