= 2010–11 UEFA Europa League qualifying (third and play-off round matches) =

European football competition

This page summarises the matches of the third qualifying and play-off rounds of 2010–11 UEFA Europa League qualifying.

Times are CEST (UTC+2), as listed by UEFA (local times, if different, are in parentheses).

== Third qualifying round ==
=== Summary ===
The first legs were played on 27 and 29 July, and the second legs were played on 3 and 5 August 2010.

Team 1	Agg.	Team 2	1st leg	2nd leg
Odense (Denmark)	5–3	(Bosnia and Herzegovina) Zrinjski Mostar	5–3	0–0
Dnepr Mogilev (Belarus)	3–1	(Czech Republic) Baník Ostrava	1–0	2–1
Rabotnicki (North Macedonia)	0–4 (Note: Order of legs reversed after original draw.)	(England) Liverpool	0–2	0–2
Marítimo (Portugal)	10–3	(Wales) Bangor City	8–2	2–1
Beroe Stara Zagora (Bulgaria)	1–4	(Austria) Rapid Wien	1–1	0–3
MYPA (Finland)	4–5	(Romania) Timișoara	1–2	3–3
CSKA Sofia (Bulgaria)	5–1	(Northern Ireland) Cliftonville	3–0	2–1
Karpaty Lviv (Ukraine)	2–0	(Georgia (country)) Zestaponi	1–0	1–0
Shamrock Rovers (Republic of Ireland)	0–3	(Italy) Juventus	0–2	0–1
IF Elfsborg (Sweden)	7–1	(North Macedonia) Teteks	5–0	2–1
Nordsjælland (Denmark)	1–3	(Portugal) Sporting CP	0–1	1–2
Maribor (Slovenia)	6–2	(Scotland) Hibernian	3–0	3–2
Red Star Belgrade (Serbia)	2–3	(Slovakia) Slovan Bratislava	1–2	1–1
Inter Turku (Finland)	3–8	(Belgium) Genk	1–5	2–3
Ruch Chorzów (Poland)	1–6	Austria Wien	1–3	0–3
Viktoria Plzeň (Czech Republic)	1–4	(Turkey) Beşiktaş	1–1	0–3
Olympiacos (Greece)	2–2 (a)	(Israel) Maccabi Tel Aviv	2–1	0–1
Wisła Kraków (Poland)	2–4	(Azerbaijan) Qarabağ	0–1	2–3
Sturm Graz (Austria)	3–1	(Georgia (country)) Dinamo Tbilisi	2–0	1–1
Cercle Brugge (Belgium)	2–3	(Cyprus) Anorthosis Famagusta	1–0	1–3
Budućnost Podgorica (Montenegro)	1–3	(Denmark) Brøndby	1–2	0–1
Molde (Norway)	4–5	(Germany) VfB Stuttgart	2–3	2–2
Maccabi Haifa (Israel)	2–3	(Belarus) Dinamo Minsk	1–0	1–3
Utrecht (Netherlands)	4–1	(Switzerland) Luzern	1–0	3–1
Sibir Novosibirsk (Russia)	2–2 (a)	(Cyprus) Apollon Limassol	1–0	1–2
Randers (Denmark)	3–4	(Switzerland) Lausanne-Sport	2–3	1–1
Dinamo București (Romania)	3–4	(Croatia) Hajduk Split	3–1	0–3
AZ (Netherlands)	2–1	(Sweden) IFK Göteborg	2–0	0–1
Spartak Zlatibor Voda (Serbia)	2–3	(Ukraine) Dnipro Dnipropetrovsk	2–1	0–2
Győri ETO (Hungary)	1–1 (4–3 p)	(France) Montpellier	0–1	1–0 (a.e.t.)
Aalesund (Norway)	1–4	(Scotland) Motherwell	1–1	0–3
Kalmar FF (Sweden)	3–6	(Bulgaria) Levski Sofia	1–1	2–5
Galatasaray (Turkey)	7–3	(Serbia) OFK Beograd	2–2	5–1
Jagiellonia Białystok (Poland)	3–4	(Greece) Aris	1–2	2–2
APOEL (Cyprus)	4–1	(Czech Republic) Jablonec	1–0	3–1

=== Matches ===
29 July 2010
19:10

Odense (Denmark)	5–3	(Bosnia and Herzegovina) Zrinjski Mostar
Gíslason 16'; Absalonsen 23'; Utaka 31', 60'; Andreasen 37'	Report	Zadro 15', 71'; Žižović 65' (pen.)

TRE-FOR Park, Odense
Attendance: 4,302
Referee: Euan Norris (Scotland)
5 August 2010
21:00

Zrinjski Mostar (Bosnia and Herzegovina)	0–0	(Denmark) Odense
	Report

Bijeli Brijeg Stadium, Mostar
Attendance: 0
Referee: Jiří Jech (Czech Republic)

Odense won 5–3 on aggregate.

29 July 2010
18:00

Dnepr Mogilev (Belarus)	1–0	(Czech Republic) Baník Ostrava
Zyankovich 63'	Report

Spartak Stadium, Mogilev
Attendance: 5,000
Referee: Robert Malek (Poland)
5 August 2010
18:00

Baník Ostrava (Czech Republic)	1–2	(Belarus) Dnepr Mogilev
Řezník 26'	Report	Yurchenko 24' (pen.); Zyankovich 70'

Bazaly, Ostrava
Attendance: 4,800
Referee: Leontios Trattou (Cyprus)

Dnepr Mogilev won 3–1 on aggregate.

29 July 2010
20:45

Rabotnicki (North Macedonia)	0–2	(England) Liverpool
	Report	Ngog 17', 59'

Philip II Arena, Skopje
Attendance: 18,000
Referee: Antonio Damato (Italy)
5 August 2010
20:45

Liverpool (England)	2–0	(North Macedonia) Rabotnicki
Ngog 22'; Gerrard 40' (pen.)	Report

Anfield, Liverpool
Attendance: 31,202
Referee: Peter Sippel (Germany)

Liverpool won 4–0 on aggregate.

29 July 2010
20:45

Marítimo (Portugal)	8–2	(Wales) Bangor City
Tchô 33', 79'; Danilo 38', 75'; Baba 51', 78'; Kanu 80'; Fidélis 90+1'	Report	Ward 73'; Jebb 90+4'

Estádio da Madeira, Funchal (Note: Played in Funchal at Estádio da Madeira as Marítimo's Estádio dos Barreiros is undergoing extensive renovative work.)
Attendance: 1,850
Referee: Oliver Drachta (Austria)
5 August 2010
20:30

Bangor City (Wales)	1–2	(Portugal) Marítimo
Bull 9'	Report	Adilson 48'; Marquinho 58'

Racecourse Ground, Wrexham (Note: Played in Wrexham at Racecourse Ground as Bangor City's Farrar Road Stadium did not meet UEFA criteria.)
Attendance: 556
Referee: Mihaly Fabian (Hungary)

Marítimo won 10–3 on aggregate.

29 July 2010
18:00

Beroe Stara Zagora (Bulgaria)	1–1	(Austria) Rapid Wien
Zlatinov 85'	Report	Hofmann 45+1' (pen.)

Georgi Asparuhov Stadium, Sofia (Note: Played in Sofia at Georgi Asparuhov Stadium as Beroe Stara Zagora's Beroe Stadium did not meet UEFA criteria.)
Attendance: 6,500
Referee: Hubert Siejewicz (Poland)
3 August 2010
18:00

Rapid Wien (Austria)	3–0	(Bulgaria) Beroe Stara Zagora
Jelavić 5', 60'; Katzer 71'	Report

Gerhard Hanappi Stadium, Vienna
Attendance: 11,700
Referee: Menashe Masiah (Israel)

Rapid Wien won 4–1 on aggregate.

29 July 2010
18:00

MYPA (Finland)	1–2	(Romania) Timișoara
Ricketts 50'	Report	Tameş 34'; Axente 74'

Saviniemi, Kouvola
Attendance: 1,310
Referee: David Mckeon (Republic of Ireland)
5 August 2010
19:30

Timișoara (Romania)	3–3	(Finland) MYPA
Axente 53'; Zicu 80'; Čišovský 90+2'	Report	Äijälä 18'; Ricketts 20', 25'

Stadionul Dan Păltinișanu, Timișoara
Attendance: 8,000
Referee: Artyom Kuchin (Kazakhstan)

Timișoara won 5–4 on aggregate.

27 July 2010
18:00

CSKA Sofia (Bulgaria)	3–0	(Northern Ireland) Cliftonville
Vidanov 9'; Marquinhos 72'; Trifonov 74'	Report

Vasil Levski National Stadium, Sofia (Note: Played in Sofia at Vasil Levski National Stadium as CSKA Sofia's Balgarska Armiya Stadium was closed at the end of the previous season because it didn't meet the BFU and UEFA criteria.)
Attendance: 5,100
Referee: Gediminas Mažeika (Lithuania)
5 August 2010
20:45

Cliftonville (Northern Ireland)	1–2	(Bulgaria) CSKA Sofia
Boyce 42'	Report	Kostadinov 85'; Marquinhos 88'

Windsor Park, Belfast (Note: Played in Belfast at Windsor Park as Cliftonville's Solitude did not meet UEFA criteria.)
Attendance: 776
Referee: Gediminas Mažeika (Lithuania)

CSKA Sofia won 5–1 on aggregate.

29 July 2010
18:15

Karpaty Lviv (Ukraine)	1–0	(Georgia (country)) Zestaponi
Khudobyak 6'	Report

Ukraina Stadium, Lviv
Attendance: 12,100
Referee: Lars Chritoffersen (Denmark)
5 August 2010
18:00

Zestaponi (Georgia (country))	0–1	(Ukraine) Karpaty Lviv
	Report	Kozhanov 90+1'

David Abashidze Stadium, Zestaponi (Note: Match was suspended in the 33rd minute for 20 minutes because of a floodlight failure.)
Attendance: 4,558
Referee: Tommy Skjerven (Norway)

Karpaty Lviv won 2–0 on aggregate.

29 July 2010
20:45

Shamrock Rovers (Republic of Ireland)	0–2	(Italy) Juventus
	Report	Amauri 3', 75'

Tallaght Stadium, Tallaght
Attendance: 6,000
Referee: David Fernández Borbalán (Spain)
5 August 2010
20:45

Juventus (Italy)	1–0	(Republic of Ireland) Shamrock Rovers
Del Piero 74'	Report

Stadio Alberto Braglia, Modena (Note: Played in Modena at Stadio Alberto Braglia as Juventus's Stadio Olimpico di Torino was to host a U2 360° Tour concert.)
Attendance: 17,579
Referee: Georgios Daloukas (Greece)

Juventus won 3–0 on aggregate.

29 July 2010
18:30

IF Elfsborg (Sweden)	5–0	(North Macedonia) Teteks
Ishizaki 29'; Svensson 50'; Avdić 57'; Nordmark 66'; Keene 77'	Report

Borås Arena, Borås
Attendance: 2,470
Referee: Stanislav Todorov (Bulgaria)
5 August 2010
17:00

Teteks (North Macedonia)	1–2	(Sweden) IF Elfsborg
Stojanovski 31'	Report	Kurbegović 43'; Jawo 56'

Philip II Arena, Skopje (Note: Played in Skopje at Philip II Arena as Teteks's City Stadium Tetovo did not meet UEFA criteria.)
Attendance: 700
Referee: Marco Borg (Malta)

IF Elfsborg won 7–1 on aggregate.

29 July 2010
20:30

Nordsjælland (Denmark)	0–1	(Portugal) Sporting CP
	Report	Vukčević 24'

Farum Park, Farum
Attendance: 4,822
Referee: Stanislav Sukhina (Russia)
5 August 2010
21:30

Sporting CP (Portugal)	2–1	(Denmark) Nordsjælland
Postiga 24'; Maniche 90+2'	Report	Lawan 79'

Estádio José Alvalade, Lisbon
Attendance: 27,152
Referee: Marijo Strahonja (Croatia)

Sporting CP won 3–1 on aggregate.

29 July 2010
20:30

Maribor (Slovenia)	3–0	(Scotland) Hibernian
Iličić 31', 51'; Tavares 60'	Report

Ljudski vrt, Maribor
Attendance: 9,000
Referee: Martin Ingvarsson (Sweden)
5 August 2010
20:45

Hibernian (Scotland)	2–3	(Slovenia) Maribor
De Graaf 54', 89'	Report	Tavares 20', 73'; Mezga 67' (pen.)

Easter Road, Edinburgh
Attendance: 13,500
Referee: Clément Turpin (France)

Maribor won 6–2 on aggregate.

29 July 2010
20:30

Red Star Belgrade (Serbia)	1–2	(Slovakia) Slovan Bratislava
Trifunović 63'	Report	Ivana 43'; Saláta 66'

Stadion Crvena Zvezda, Belgrade
Attendance: 33,065
Referee: Jorge Sousa (Portugal)
5 August 2010
20:30

Slovan Bratislava (Slovakia)	1–1	(Serbia) Red Star Belgrade
Đorđević 2' (o.g.)	Report	Cadú 73'

Štadión Pasienky, Bratislava (Note: Played in Bratislava at Štadión Pasienky as Slovan Bratislava's Tehelné pole was undergoing extensive renovative work.)
Attendance: 9,250
Referee: Markus Strömbergsson (Sweden)

Slovan Bratislava won 3–2 on aggregate.

29 July 2010
18:00

Inter Turku (Finland)	1–5	(Belgium) Genk
Grot 53'	Report	De Bruyne 16'; Ogunjimi 43'; Barda 60'; Vossen 77', 85'

Veritas Stadion, Turku
Attendance: 3,247
Referee: Radek Příhoda (Czech Republic)
5 August 2010
20:00

Genk (Belgium)	3–2	(Finland) Inter Turku
Ogunjimi 24'; Tőzsér 80' (pen.); Huysegems 85'	Report	Antunez 35', 90'

Cristal Arena, Genk
Attendance: 15,407
Referee: Fırat Aydınus (Turkey)

Genk won 8–3 on aggregate.

29 July 2010
18:00

Ruch Chorzów (Poland)	1–3	Austria Wien
Pulkowski 4'	Report	Linz 8'; Hlinka 43'; Jun 73'

Stadion Miejski, Chorzów
Attendance: 7,000
Referee: Michael Koukoulakis (Greece)
5 August 2010
20:30

Austria Wien	3–0	(Poland) Ruch Chorzów
Klein 4' (pen.); Baumgartlinger 10', 21'	Report

Franz Horr Stadium, Vienna
Attendance: 10,000
Referee: Pol van Boekel (Netherlands)

Austria Wien won 6–1 on aggregate.

29 July 2010
20:30

Viktoria Plzeň (Czech Republic)	1–1	(Turkey) Beşiktaş
Limberský 28'	Report	Delgado 44' (pen.)

Generali Arena, Prague (Note: Played in Prague at Generali Arena as Viktoria Plzeň's Stadion města Plzně did not meet UEFA criteria.)
Attendance: 5,875
Referee: Carlos Clos Gómez (Spain)
5 August 2010
20:00

Beşiktaş (Turkey)	3–0	(Czech Republic) Viktoria Plzeň
Quaresma 38'; Delgado 57'; Hološko 71'	Report

BJK İnönü Stadium, Istanbul
Attendance: 25,975
Referee: Jérôme Efong Nzolo (Belgium)

Beşiktaş won 4–1 on aggregate.

29 July 2010
20:30

Olympiacos (Greece)	2–1	(Israel) Maccabi Tel Aviv
Zairi 67'; Rommedahl 73'	Report	Medunjanin 18' (pen.)

Karaiskakis Stadium, Piraeus
Attendance: 70
Referee: Dougie McDonald (Scotland)
5 August 2010
20:00

Maccabi Tel Aviv (Israel)	1–0	(Greece) Olympiacos
Colautti 42'	Report

Bloomfield Stadium, Tel Aviv
Attendance: 12,421
Referee: Luca Banti (Italy)

2–2 on aggregate; Maccabi Tel Aviv won on away goals.

29 July 2010
20:00

Wisła Kraków (Poland)	0–1	(Azerbaijan) Qarabağ
	Report	Nadirov 69'

Suche Stawy, Kraków
Attendance: 4,200
Referee: Tom Harald Hagen (Norway)
5 August 2010
18:00

Qarabağ (Azerbaijan)	3–2	(Poland) Wisła Kraków
Ismayilov 28'; Aliyev 33'; Sadiqov 35'	Report	Pa. Brożek 56'; Boguski 88'

Tofiq Bahramov Stadium, Baku (Note: Played in Baku at Tofiq Bahramov Stadium as Qarabağ's Guzanli Olympic Stadium did not meet UEFA criteria.)
Attendance: 29,500
Referee: Bülent Yıldırım (Turkey)

Qarabağ won 4–2 on aggregate.

29 July 2010
20:30

Sturm Graz (Austria)	2–0	(Georgia (country)) Dinamo Tbilisi
Feldhofer 49'; Kienast 59'	Report

UPC-Arena, Graz
Attendance: 4,700
Referee: Hannes Kaasik (Estonia)
5 August 2010
18:30

Dinamo Tbilisi (Georgia (country))	1–1	(Austria) Sturm Graz
Robertinho 11'	Report	Muratović 40' (pen.)

Boris Paichadze Stadium, Tbilisi
Attendance: 5,000
Referee: Milorad Mažic (Serbia)

Sturm Graz won 3–1 on aggregate.

29 July 2010
20:00

Cercle Brugge (Belgium)	1–0	(Cyprus) Anorthosis Famagusta
Foley 68'	Report

Jan Breydel Stadium, Bruges
Attendance: 4,762
Referee: Viktor Shvetsov (Ukraine)
5 August 2010
19:00

Anorthosis Famagusta (Cyprus)	3–1	(Belgium) Cercle Brugge
Cafú 45+1', 60', 87'	Report	Owusu 78'

Antonis Papadopoulos Stadium, Larnaca
Attendance: 8,500
Referee: Matej Jug (Slovenia)

Anorthosis Famagusta won 3–2 on aggregate.

29 July 2010
21:00

Budućnost Podgorica (Montenegro)	1–2	(Denmark) Brøndby
Bećiraj 90+3'	Report	Adamović 73' (o.g.); Jensen 87'

Stadion Pod Goricom, Podgorica
Attendance: 4,200
Referee: Richard Liesveld (Netherlands)
5 August 2010
19:30

Brøndby (Denmark)	1–0	(Montenegro) Budućnost Podgorica
Jallow 11'	Report

Brøndby Stadium, Brøndbyvester
Attendance: 7,003
Referee: Duarte Gomes (Portugal)

Brøndby won 3–1 on aggregate.

29 July 2010
18:30

Molde (Norway)	2–3	(Germany) VfB Stuttgart
Moström 65'; Hoseth 76'	Report	Rudy 27'; Kuzmanović 74'; Harnik 82'

Aker Stadion, Molde
Attendance: 3,270
Referee: Bas Nijhuis (Netherlands)
5 August 2010
20:30

VfB Stuttgart (Germany)	2–2	(Norway) Molde
Pogrebnyak 55'; Gebhart 90+3'	Report	Johansson 41'; Rindarøy 49'

Mercedes-Benz Arena, Stuttgart
Attendance: 11,500
Referee: Mauro Bergonzi (Italy)

VfB Stuttgart won 5–4 on aggregate.

29 July 2010
19:45

Maccabi Haifa (Israel)	1–0	(Belarus) Dinamo Minsk
Dvalishvili 30'	Report

Kiryat Eliezer Stadium, Haifa
Attendance: 10,000
Referee: Daniele Orsato (Italy)
5 August 2010
18:00

Dinamo Minsk (Belarus)	3–1	(Israel) Maccabi Haifa
Strakhanovich 35'; Putsila 54', 90'	Report	Dvalishvili 27'

Dinamo Stadium, Minsk
Attendance: 5,000
Referee: Hervé Piccirillo (France)

Dinamo Minsk won 3–2 on aggregate.

29 July 2010
18:45

Utrecht (Netherlands)	1–0	(Switzerland) Luzern
Mertens 35'	Report

Stadion Galgenwaard, Utrecht
Attendance: 12,100
Referee: Peter Rasmussen (Denmark)
5 August 2010
19:45

Luzern (Switzerland)	1–3	(Netherlands) Utrecht
Pacar 53'	Report	Asare 13'; Van Wolfswinkel 22'; Silberbauer 28'

Letzigrund, Zürich (Note: Played in Zürich at Letzigrund as Luzern's Stadion Allmend did not meet UEFA criteria.)
Attendance: 7,100
Referee: Aleksei Kulbakov (Belarus)

Utrecht won 4–1 on aggregate.

29 July 2010
14:00

Sibir Novosibirsk (Russia)	1–0	(Cyprus) Apollon Limassol
Medvedev 74'	Report

Spartak Stadium, Novosibirsk
Attendance: 10,000
Referee: Libor Kovařík (Czech Republic)
5 August 2010
19:00

Apollon Limassol (Cyprus)	2–1	(Russia) Sibir Novosibirsk
Semedo 12'; Núñez 71'	Report	Shevchenko 63'

Tsirion Stadium, Limassol
Attendance: 6,000
Referee: Zsolt Szabo (Hungary)

2–2 on aggregate; Sibir Novosibirsk won on away goals.

29 July 2010
19:00

Randers (Denmark)	2–3	(Switzerland) Lausanne-Sport
Movsisyan 7', 81'	Report	Steuble 41'; Silvio 62' (pen.), 84'

Essex Park Randers, Randers
Attendance: 2,751
Referee: Ovidiu Alin Hațegan (Romania)
5 August 2010
19:30

Lausanne-Sport (Switzerland)	1–1	(Denmark) Randers
Rodrigo 68'	Report	Movsisyan 49'

Stade Olympique de la Pontaise, Lausanne
Attendance: 8,150
Referee: Alan Black (Northern Ireland)

Lausanne-Sport won 4–3 on aggregate.

29 July 2010
20:00

Dinamo București (Romania)	3–1	(Croatia) Hajduk Split
Cristea 6' (pen.); Garat 40'; Koné 70'	Report	Tomasov 64'

Stadionul Dinamo, Bucharest
Attendance: 7,816
Referee: Lee Probert (England)
5 August 2010
20:30

Hajduk Split (Croatia)	3–0	(Romania) Dinamo București
Vukušić 12'; Brkljača 23'; Tomasov 38'	Report

Gradski Stadion, Split
Attendance: 25,000
Referee: Carlos Xistra (Portugal)

Hajduk Split won 4–3 on aggregate.

29 July 2010
20:45

AZ (Netherlands)	2–0	(Sweden) IFK Göteborg
Klavan 52'; Guðmundsson 55'	Report

AZ Stadion, Alkmaar
Attendance: 11,563
Referee: Fernando Teixeira Vitienes (Spain)
5 August 2010
19:00

IFK Göteborg (Sweden)	1–0	(Netherlands) AZ
Selaković 67'	Report

Gamla Ullevi, Gothenburg
Attendance: 10,115
Referee: Claudio Circhetta (Switzerland)

AZ won 2–1 on aggregate.

29 July 2010
17:30

Spartak Zlatibor Voda (Serbia)	2–1	(Ukraine) Dnipro Dnipropetrovsk
Torbica 16' (pen.), 90' (pen.)	Report	Homenyuk 23'

Karađorđe Stadium, Novi Sad (Note: Played in Novi Sad at Karađorđe Stadium as Spartak Zlatibor Voda's Subotica City Stadium did not meet UEFA criteria.)
Attendance: 1,500
Referee: Andre Marriner (England)
5 August 2010
19:00

Dnipro Dnipropetrovsk (Ukraine)	2–0	(Serbia) Spartak Zlatibor Voda
Seleznyov 45'; Holek 48'	Report

Dnipro Arena, Dnipropetrovsk
Attendance: 24,428
Referee: Stephan Studer (Switzerland)

Dnipro Dnipropetrovsk won 3–2 on aggregate.

29 July 2010
20:30

Győri ETO (Hungary)	0–1	(France) Montpellier
	Report	Giroud 32'

ETO Park, Győr
Attendance: 7,000
Referee: Marcin Borski (Poland)
5 August 2010
20:45

Montpellier (France)	0–1 (a.e.t.)	(Hungary) Győri ETO
	Report	Babić 40'
Penalties
Spahić (penalty scored); Camara (penalty missed); Estrada (penalty missed); Giroud (penalty scored); Armand (penalty scored)	3–4	(penalty scored) Babić; (penalty missed) Aleksidze; (penalty scored) Pilibaitis; (penalty scored) Fehér; (penalty scored) Tokody

Stade de la Mosson, Montpellier
Attendance: 9,918
Referee: Mattias Gestranius (Finland)

1–1 on aggregate; Győri ETO won 4–3 on penalties.

29 July 2010
19:00

Aalesund (Norway)	1–1	(Scotland) Motherwell
Mathisen 90+3' (pen.)	Report	Murphy 48'

Color Line Stadion, Ålesund
Attendance: 8,450
Referee: Albert Toussaint (Luxembourg)
5 August 2010
20:45

Motherwell (Scotland)	3–0	(Norway) Aalesund
Murphy 3'; Sutton 13'; Page 89'	Report

Fir Park, Motherwell
Attendance: 7,721
Referee: Richard Trutz (Slovakia)

Motherwell won 4–1 on aggregate.

29 July 2010
19:30

Kalmar FF (Sweden)	1–1	(Bulgaria) Levski Sofia
Dauda 83'	Report	Joãozinho 28'

Fredriksskans, Kalmar
Attendance: 2,489
Referee: Boško Jovanetić (Serbia)
5 August 2010
19:45

Levski Sofia (Bulgaria)	5–2	(Sweden) Kalmar FF
Dembélé 12', 70'; Mladenov 33'; Isa 90+1', 90+2'	Report	Johansson 82'; Israelsson 84'

Georgi Asparuhov Stadium, Sofia
Attendance: 9,470
Referee: Antony Gautier (France)

Levski Sofia won 6–3 on aggregate.

29 July 2010
20:00

Galatasaray (Turkey)	2–2	(Serbia) OFK Beograd
Turan 26', 76'	Report	Krstić 80'; Injac 86'

Ali Sami Yen Stadium, Istanbul
Attendance: 15,703
Referee: Nicolai Vollquartz (Denmark)
5 August 2010
17:00

OFK Beograd (Serbia)	1–5	(Turkey) Galatasaray
Nikolić 32'	Report	Sarp 12'; Kewell 22', 57' (pen.); Turan 71'; Batdal 81'

Omladinski Stadium, Belgrade
Attendance: 6,000
Referee: Daniel Stalhammar (Sweden)

Galatasaray won 7–3 on aggregate.

29 July 2010
20:45

Jagiellonia Białystok (Poland)	1–2	(Greece) Aris
Grzyb 24'	Report	Calvo 4' (pen.), 8'

Stadion Miejski, Białystok
Attendance: 5,120
Referee: Espen Berntsen (Norway)
5 August 2010
19:45

Aris (Greece)	2–2	(Poland) Jagiellonia Białystok
Cesarec 19', 75' (pen.)	Report	Burkhardt 25', 66'

Kleanthis Vikelidis Stadium, Thessaloniki
Attendance: 15,139
Referee: Alexandru Deaconu (Romania)

Aris won 4–3 on aggregate.

29 July 2010
19:00

APOEL (Cyprus)	1–0	(Czech Republic) Jablonec
Solari 55'	Report

GSP Stadium, Nicosia
Attendance: 13,978
Referee: Simon Lee Evans (Wales)
5 August 2010
20:00

Jablonec (Czech Republic)	1–3	(Cyprus) APOEL
Pavlík 33'	Report	Paulo Jorge 24'; Charalambidis 28'; Solari 37'

Chance Arena, Jablonec nad Nisou
Attendance: 3,622
Referee: Tony Asumaa (Finland)

APOEL won 4–1 on aggregate.

== Play-off round ==
=== Summary ===
The first legs were played on 17 and 19 August, and the second legs were played on 24 and 26 August 2010.

Team 1	Agg.	Team 2	1st leg	2nd leg
Paris Saint-Germain (France)	5–4	(Israel) Maccabi Tel Aviv	2–0	3–4
Bayer Leverkusen (Germany)	6–1	(Ukraine) Tavriya Simferopol	3–0	3–1
CSKA Moscow (Russia)	6–1	(Cyprus) Anorthosis Famagusta	4–0	2–1
Hajduk Split (Croatia)	5–2	(Romania) Unirea Urziceni	4–1	1–1
Feyenoord (Netherlands)	1–2	(Belgium) Gent	1–0	0–2
Genk (Belgium)	2–7	(Portugal) Porto	0–3	2–4
Debrecen (Hungary)	4–1	(Bulgaria) Litex Lovech	2–0	2–1
Aris (Greece)	2–1	Austria Wien	1–0	1–1
Galatasaray (Turkey)	3–3 (a)	(Ukraine) Karpaty Lviv	2–2	1–1
Palermo (Italy)	5–3	(Slovenia) Maribor	3–0	2–3
Club Brugge (Belgium)	5–3	(Belarus) Dinamo Minsk	2–1	3–2
Omonia (Cyprus)	2–3	(Ukraine) Metalist Kharkiv	0–1	2–2
Vaslui (Romania)	0–2	(France) Lille	0–0	0–2
Napoli (Italy)	3–0	(Sweden) IF Elfsborg	1–0	2–0
Sporting CP (Portugal)	3–2	(Denmark) Brøndby	0–2	3–0
Steaua București (Romania)	1–1 (4–3 p) (Note: Order of legs reversed after original draw.)	(Switzerland) Grasshopper	1–0	0–1 (a.e.t.)
Liverpool (England)	3–1	(Turkey) Trabzonspor	1–0	2–1
Celtic (Scotland)	2–4	(Netherlands) Utrecht	2–0	0–4
Borussia Dortmund (Germany)	5–0	(Azerbaijan) Qarabağ	4–0	1–0
AIK (Sweden)	1–2	(Bulgaria) Levski Sofia	0–0	1–2
Sturm Graz (Austria)	1–3	(Italy) Juventus	1–2	0–1
Getafe (Spain)	2–1	(Cyprus) APOEL	1–0	1–1 (a.e.t.)
Dundee United (Scotland)	1–2	(Greece) AEK Athens	0–1	1–1
AZ (Netherlands)	3–2	(Kazakhstan) Aktobe	2–0	1–2
Dnipro Dnipropetrovsk (Ukraine)	0–1	(Poland) Lech Poznań	0–1	0–0
Rapid Wien (Austria)	4–3	(England) Aston Villa	1–1	3–2
CSKA Sofia (Bulgaria)	5–2	(Wales) The New Saints	3–0	2–2
Beşiktaş (Turkey)	6–0	(Finland) HJK	2–0	4–0
Slovan Bratislava (Slovakia)	2–3	(Germany) VfB Stuttgart	0–1	2–2
Sibir Novosibirsk (Russia)	1–5	(Netherlands) PSV Eindhoven	1–0	0–5
BATE Borisov (Belarus)	5–1	(Portugal) Marítimo	3–0	2–1
Lausanne-Sport (Switzerland)	2–2 (4–3 p)	(Russia) Lokomotiv Moscow	1–1	1–1 (a.e.t.)
Győri ETO (Hungary)	1–4	(Croatia) Dinamo Zagreb	0–2	1–2
Odense (Denmark)	3–1	(Scotland) Motherwell	2–1	1–0
PAOK (Greece)	2–1	(Turkey) Fenerbahçe	1–0	1–1 (a.e.t.)
Villarreal (Spain)	7–1	(Belarus) Dnepr Mogilev	5–0	2–1
Timișoara (Romania)	0–3	(England) Manchester City	0–1	0–2

=== Matches ===
19 August 2010
18:30

Paris Saint-Germain (France)	2–0	(Israel) Maccabi Tel Aviv
Luyindula 3'; Hoarau 60'	Report

Parc des Princes, Paris
Attendance: 8,500
Referee: Kevin Blom (Netherlands)
26 August 2010
20:00

Maccabi Tel Aviv (Israel)	4–3	(France) Paris Saint-Germain
Atar 48', 90+5'; Avidor 68'; Medunjanin 83' (pen.)	Report	Hoarau 40' (pen.); Giuly 64'; Nenê 90+3' (pen.)

Bloomfield Stadium, Tel Aviv
Attendance: 8,674
Referee: Mike Dean (England)

Paris Saint-Germain won 5–4 on aggregate.

19 August 2010
18:30

Bayer Leverkusen (Germany)	3–0	(Ukraine) Tavriya Simferopol
Kadlec 1', 84'; Ballack 90+1' (pen.)	Report

BayArena, Leverkusen
Attendance: 13,000
Referee: Fredy Fautrel (France)
26 August 2010
20:00

Tavriya Simferopol (Ukraine)	1–3	(Germany) Bayer Leverkusen
Idahor 5' (pen.)	Report	Vidal 50' (pen.); Holaydo 74' (o.g.); Castro 90+2'

Lokomotiv Stadium, Simferopol
Attendance: 10,700
Referee: Alexandru Tudor (Romania)

Bayer Leverkusen won 6–1 on aggregate.

19 August 2010
18:30

CSKA Moscow (Russia)	4–0	(Cyprus) Anorthosis Famagusta
Doumbia 13', 20'; Tošić 48', 74'	Report

Arena Khimki, Khimki
Attendance: 6,000
Referee: Sascha Kever (Switzerland)
24 August 2010
18:00

Anorthosis Famagusta (Cyprus)	1–2	(Russia) CSKA Moscow
Cafú 76'	Report	Doumbia 85'; González 89'

Antonis Papadopoulos Stadium, Larnaca
Attendance: 4,000
Referee: Alexandru Deaconu (Romania)

CSKA Moscow won 6–1 on aggregate.

19 August 2010
20:30

Hajduk Split (Croatia)	4–1	(Romania) Unirea Urziceni
Ibričić 39', 66'; Brkljača 78'; Čop 85'	Report	Frunză 34'

Gradski stadion u Poljudu, Split
Attendance: 35,000
Referee: Antonio Damato (Italy)
26 August 2010
19:30

Unirea Urziceni (Romania)	1–1	(Croatia) Hajduk Split
Bilașco 2'	Report	Vukušić 88'

Stadionul Steaua, Bucharest (Note: Played in Bucharest at Stadionul Steaua as Unirea Urziceni's Stadionul Tineretului did not meet UEFA criteria.)
Attendance: 918
Referee: Claudio Circhetta (Switzerland)

Hajduk Split won 5–2 on aggregate.

19 August 2010
19:15

Feyenoord (Netherlands)	1–0	(Belgium) Gent
Fer 78'	Report

De Kuip, Rotterdam
Attendance: 34,000
Referee: Bruno Paixão (Portugal)
26 August 2010
20:00

Gent (Belgium)	2–0	(Netherlands) Feyenoord
Soumahoro 34'; Coulibaly 62'	Report

Jules Ottenstadion, Ghent
Attendance: 8,787
Referee: Eduardo Iturralde González (Spain)

Gent won 2–1 on aggregate.

19 August 2010
20:30

Genk (Belgium)	0–3	(Portugal) Porto
	Report	Falcao 29' (pen.); Souza 82'; Belluschi 90'

Cristal Arena, Genk
Attendance: 13,711
Referee: Luca Banti (Italy)
26 August 2010
21:30

Porto (Portugal)	4–2	(Belgium) Genk
Hulk 36', 59' (pen.), 63'; Fernando 53'	Report	Vossen 22', 56'

Estádio do Dragão, Porto
Attendance: 33,512
Referee: Georgios Daloukas (Greece)

Porto won 7–2 on aggregate.

19 August 2010
19:00

Debrecen (Hungary)	2–0	(Bulgaria) Litex Lovech
Coulibaly 22'; Laczkó 33'	Report

Városi Stadion, Nyíregyháza (Note: Played in Nyíregyháza at Városi Stadion as Debrecen's Stadion Oláh Gábor Út did not meet UEFA criteria.)
Attendance: 8,125
Referee: Leontios Trattou (Cyprus)
26 August 2010
19:30

Litex Lovech (Bulgaria)	1–2	(Hungary) Debrecen
Niflore 68'	Report	Mbengono 53'; Czvitkovics 81'

Lovech Stadium, Lovech
Attendance: 2,500
Referee: Robert Malek (Poland)

Debrecen won 4–1 on aggregate.

17 August 2010
18:00

Aris (Greece)	1–0	Austria Wien
Ruiz 90+3'	Report

Kleanthis Vikelidis Stadium, Thessaloniki
Attendance: 19,040
Referee: Maxim Layushkin (Russia)
26 August 2010
19:00

Austria Wien	1–1	(Greece) Aris
Linz 56'	Report	Ruiz 42'

Franz Horr Stadium, Wien
Attendance: 11,000
Referee: Daniel Stalhammar (Sweden)

Aris won 2–1 on aggregate.

19 August 2010
20:00

Galatasaray (Turkey)	2–2	(Ukraine) Karpaty Lviv
Baroš 59', 86'	Report	Kuznetsov 34'; Zenjov 41'

Ali Sami Yen Stadium, Istanbul
Attendance: 15,182
Referee: Mark Clattenburg (England)
26 August 2010
20:45

Karpaty Lviv (Ukraine)	1–1	(Turkey) Galatasaray
Fedetskiy 90+3'	Report	A. Yılmaz 90+1'

Ukraina Stadium, Lviv
Attendance: 25,000
Referee: Thorsten Kinhöfer (Germany)

3–3 on aggregate; Karpaty Lviv won on away goals.

19 August 2010
20:30

Palermo (Italy)	3–0	(Slovenia) Maribor
Maccarone 37' (pen.); Hernández 39'; Pastore 77'	Report

Stadio Renzo Barbera, Palermo
Attendance: 28,416
Referee: Douglas McDonald (Scotland)
26 August 2010
20:45

Maribor (Slovenia)	3–2	(Italy) Palermo
Tavares 14'; Iličić 58'; Anđelković 89'	Report	Hernández 62', 68'

Ljudski vrt, Maribor
Attendance: 12,200
Referee: Stanislav Sukhina (Russia)

Palermo won 5–3 on aggregate.

19 August 2010
20:30

Club Brugge (Belgium)	2–1	(Belarus) Dinamo Minsk
Hoefkens 71' (pen.); Blondel 84'	Report	Drahun 6'

Jan Breydel Stadium, Bruges
Attendance: 24,587
Referee: Marcin Borski (Poland)
26 August 2010
18:00

Dinamo Minsk (Belarus)	2–3	(Belgium) Club Brugge
Chukhley 47'; Drahun 90'	Report	Hoefkens 5' (pen.), 32' (pen.); Dalmat 26'

Dinamo Stadium, Minsk
Attendance: 7,000
Referee: Duarte Gomes (Portugal)

Club Brugge won 5–3 on aggregate.

19 August 2010
19:00

Omonia (Cyprus)	0–1	(Ukraine) Metalist Kharkiv
	Report	Dević 24'

GSP Stadium, Nicosia
Attendance: 10,179
Referee: Nicolai Vollquartz (Denmark)
26 August 2010
19:00

Metalist Kharkiv (Ukraine)	2–2	(Cyprus) Omonia
Dević 66'; Cleiton Xavier 71'	Report	Leandro 60'; Rengifo 64'

Metalist Stadium, Kharkiv
Attendance: 30,360
Referee: Matej Jug (Slovenia)

Metalist Kharkiv won 3–2 on aggregate.

19 August 2010
19:00

Vaslui (Romania)	0–0	(France) Lille
	Report

Stadionul Municipal, Vaslui
Attendance: 3,821
Referee: Bülent Yıldırım (Turkey)
26 August 2010
20:45

Lille (France)	2–0	(Romania) Vaslui
Cabaye 69' (pen.); Chedjou 80'	Report

Stadium Nord Lille Métropole, Villeneuve-d'Ascq
Attendance: 16,876
Referee: Tom Harald Hagen (Norway)

Lille won 2–0 on aggregate.

19 August 2010
21:00

Napoli (Italy)	1–0	(Sweden) IF Elfsborg
Lavezzi 45+1'	Report

Stadio San Paolo, Naples
Attendance: 33,534
Referee: Anastassios Kakos (Greece)
26 August 2010
20:45

IF Elfsborg (Sweden)	0–2	(Italy) Napoli
	Report	Cavani 29', 38'

Borås Arena, Borås
Attendance: 10,621
Referee: Said Ennjimi (France)

Napoli won 3–0 on aggregate.

19 August 2010
21:30

Sporting CP (Portugal)	0–2	(Denmark) Brøndby
	Report	Kristiansen 43'; Jallow 52'

Estádio José Alvalade, Lisbon
Attendance: 20,057
Referee: Robert Schörgenhofer (Austria)
26 August 2010
19:00

Brøndby (Denmark)	0–3	(Portugal) Sporting CP
	Report	Evaldo 45+1'; Coelho 75'; Djaló 90+1'

Brøndby Stadium, Brøndbyvester
Attendance: 20,389
Referee: Jiří Jech (Czech Republic)

Sporting CP won 3–2 on aggregate.

19 August 2010
19:45

Steaua București (Romania)	1–0	(Switzerland) Grasshopper
Stancu 71'	Report

Stadionul Steaua, Bucharest
Attendance: 20,000
Referee: Jonas Eriksson (Sweden)
26 August 2010
19:30

Grasshopper (Switzerland)	1–0 (a.e.t.)	(Romania) Steaua București
Salatić 77'	Report
Penalties
Smiljanić (penalty missed); Salatić (penalty scored); Abrashi (penalty scored); Hajrović (penalty scored); Adili (penalty missed)	3–4	(penalty scored) Stancu; (penalty scored) Surdu; (penalty scored) Angelov; (penalty scored) Latovlevici

Letzigrund, Zürich
Attendance: 5,200
Referee: Milorad Mažić (Serbia)

1–1 on aggregate; Steaua București won 4–3 on penalties.

19 August 2010
20:45

Liverpool (England)	1–0	(Turkey) Trabzonspor
Babel 45+1'	Report

Anfield, Liverpool
Attendance: 40,941
Referee: Thomas Einwaller (Austria)
26 August 2010
19:30

Trabzonspor (Turkey)	1–2	(England) Liverpool
Gutiérrez 4'	Report	Kaçar 83' (o.g.); Kuyt 88'

Hüseyin Avni Aker Stadium, Trabzon
Attendance: 18,630
Referee: Ivan Bebek (Croatia)

Liverpool won 3–1 on aggregate.

19 August 2010
20:45

Celtic (Scotland)	2–0	(Netherlands) Utrecht
Juárez 19'; Samaras 34'	Report

Celtic Park, Glasgow
Attendance: 35,755
Referee: Svein Oddvar Moen (Norway)
26 August 2010
20:30

Utrecht (Netherlands)	4–0	(Scotland) Celtic
Van Wolfswinkel 12' (pen.), 19' (pen.), 46'; Maguire 62'	Report

Stadion Galgenwaard, Utrecht
Attendance: 18,000
Referee: Carlos Velasco Carballo (Spain)

Utrecht won 4–2 on aggregate.

19 August 2010
21:05

Borussia Dortmund (Germany)	4–0	(Azerbaijan) Qarabağ
Kagawa 13', 41'; Barrios 21', 29'	Report

Westfalenstadion, Dortmund
Attendance: 47,800
Referee: Cristian Balaj (Romania)
26 August 2010
18:00

Qarabağ (Azerbaijan)	0–1	(Germany) Borussia Dortmund
	Report	Barrios 90+1'

Tofiq Bahramov Stadium, Baku
Attendance: 17,000
Referee: Serge Gumienny (Belgium)

Borussia Dortmund won 5–0 on aggregate.

19 August 2010
19:00

AIK (Sweden)	0–0	(Bulgaria) Levski Sofia
	Report

Råsunda Stadium, Solna
Attendance: 8,212
Referee: Pavel Kralovec (Czech Republic)
26 August 2010
19:30

Levski Sofia (Bulgaria)	2–1	(Sweden) AIK
Mladenov 49'; Dembélé 51'	Report	Bangura 11'

Georgi Asparuhov Stadium, Sofia
Attendance: 18,000
Referee: Viktor Shvetsov (Ukraine)

Levski Sofia won 2–1 on aggregate.

19 August 2010
21:05

Sturm Graz (Austria)	1–2	(Italy) Juventus
Schildenfeld 82'	Report	Bonucci 15'; Amauri 90+1'

UPC-Arena, Graz
Attendance: 15,322
Referee: Cüneyt Çakır (Turkey)
26 August 2010
20:45

Juventus (Italy)	1–0	(Austria) Sturm Graz
Del Piero 53'	Report

Stadio Olimpico di Torino, Turin
Attendance: 15,585
Referee: William Collum (Scotland)

Juventus won 3–1 on aggregate.

19 August 2010
21:00

Getafe (Spain)	1–0	(Cyprus) APOEL
Parejo 43'	Report

Coliseum Alfonso Pérez, Getafe
Attendance: 4,235
Referee: Darko Čeferin (Slovenia)
26 August 2010
19:00

APOEL (Cyprus)	1–1 (a.e.t.)	(Spain) Getafe
Aílton 41'	Report	Díaz 98'

GSP Stadium, Nicosia
Attendance: 18,643
Referee: Alan Kelly (Republic of Ireland)

Getafe won 2–1 on aggregate.

19 August 2010
21:00

Dundee United (Scotland)	0–1	(Greece) AEK Athens
	Report	Djebbour 11'

Tannadice Park, Dundee
Attendance: 12,116
Referee: Marijo Strahonja (Croatia)
26 August 2010
20:00

AEK Athens (Greece)	1–1	(Scotland) Dundee United
Diop 23'	Report	Daly 78'

Karaiskakis Stadium, Piraeus (Note: Played in Piraeus at Karaiskakis Stadium as AEK Athens's Olympic Stadium was deemed unsuitable due to the quality of the playing surface. Initially, it would be played in Athens at Nea Smyrni Stadium but it was vandalised by Panionios ultras who have a fierce violent rivalry with AEK Athens's ultras. As a result of this, UEFA decreed that no AEK fans would be allowed to watch the match inside the stadium.)
Attendance: 700
Referee: Libor Kovařik (Czech Republic)

AEK Athens won 2–1 on aggregate.

19 August 2010
21:00

AZ (Netherlands)	2–0	(Kazakhstan) Aktobe
Holman 20'; Wernbloom 27'	Report

AZ Stadion, Alkmaar
Attendance: 10,385
Referee: Alon Yefet (Israel)
26 August 2010
18:00

Aktobe (Kazakhstan)	2–1	(Netherlands) AZ
Tleshev 67', 88'	Report	Wernbloom 10'

Aktobe Central Stadium, Aktobe
Attendance: 12,600
Referee: Aleksei Kulbakov (Belarus)

AZ won 3–2 on aggregate.

19 August 2010
19:00

Dnipro Dnipropetrovsk (Ukraine)	0–1	(Poland) Lech Poznań
	Report	Arboleda 5'

Dnipro Stadium, Dnipropetrovsk
Attendance: 21,420
Referee: Martin Ingvarsson (Sweden)
26 August 2010
20:15

Lech Poznań (Poland)	0–0	(Ukraine) Dnipro Dnipropetrovsk
	Report

Stadion Miejski, Poznań
Attendance: 14,000
Referee: Bas Nijhuis (Netherlands)

Lech Poznań won 1–0 on aggregate.

19 August 2010
18:45

Rapid Wien (Austria)	1–1	(England) Aston Villa
Nuhiu 33'	Report	Bannan 11'

Gerhard Hanappi Stadium, Vienna
Attendance: 17,500
Referee: Alain Hamer (Luxembourg)
26 August 2010
20:45

Aston Villa (England)	2–3	(Austria) Rapid Wien
Agbonlahor 22'; Heskey 76'	Report	Nuhiu 52'; Sonnleitner 78'; Gartler 81'

Villa Park, Birmingham
Attendance: 29,980
Referee: Eric Braamhaar (Netherlands)

Rapid Wien won 4–3 on aggregate.

19 August 2010
20:30

CSKA Sofia (Bulgaria)	3–0	(Wales) The New Saints
Aquaro 81'; Nelson 82'; Delev 90'	Report

Vasil Levski National Stadium, Sofia
Attendance: 4,000
Referee: Hannes Kaasik (Estonia)
26 August 2010
20:35

The New Saints (Wales)	2–2	(Bulgaria) CSKA Sofia
M. Williams 13'; Evans 61'	Report	Aquaro 10'; Tiboni 79'

Racecourse Ground, Wrexham (Note: Played in Wrexham at Racecourse Ground as The New Saints chose to move the match from their Park Hall ground to increase revenue.)
Attendance: 843
Referee: Tony Asumaa (Finland)

CSKA Sofia won 5–2 on aggregate.

17 August 2010
18:00

Beşiktaş (Turkey)	2–0	(Finland) HJK
Hilbert 35'; Quaresma 66'	Report

BJK İnönü Stadium, Istanbul
Attendance: 19,040
Referee: Ovidiu Hațegan (Romania)
26 August 2010
18:45

HJK (Finland)	0–4	(Turkey) Beşiktaş
	Report	Quaresma 15'; Guti 67'; Uysal 77'; Hološko 90+3'

Sonera Stadium, Helsinki
Attendance: 9,054
Referee: Peter Rasmussen (Denmark)

Beşiktaş won 6–0 on aggregate.

19 August 2010
18:45

Slovan Bratislava (Slovakia)	0–1	(Germany) VfB Stuttgart
	Report	Harnik 88'

Štadión Pasienky, Bratislava
Attendance: 8,120
Referee: Tony Chapron (France)
26 August 2010
20:00

VfB Stuttgart (Germany)	2–2	(Slovakia) Slovan Bratislava
Gebhart 56'; Gentner 64'	Report	Dobrotka 9'; Sylvestr 53'

Mercedes-Benz Arena, Stuttgart
Attendance: 12,100
Referee: Aleksei Nikolaev (Russia)

VfB Stuttgart won 3–2 on aggregate.

19 August 2010
14:00

Sibir Novosibirsk (Russia)	1–0	(Netherlands) PSV Eindhoven
Degtyaryov 90+2'	Report

Spartak Stadium, Novosibirsk
Attendance: 11,500
Referee: Tommy Skjerven (Norway)
26 August 2010
19:30

PSV Eindhoven (Netherlands)	5–0	(Russia) Sibir Novosibirsk
Berg 38'; Engelaar 56'; Toivonen 64'; Dzsudzsák 73', 90' (pen.)	Report

Philips Stadion, Eindhoven
Attendance: 20,900
Referee: Stefan Johannesson (Sweden)

PSV Eindhoven won 5–1 on aggregate.

19 August 2010
18:00

BATE Borisov (Belarus)	3–0	(Portugal) Marítimo
Alyakhnovich 56'; Bressan 60'; Pawlaw 70'	Report

Haradski Stadium, Barysaw
Attendance: 5,230
Referee: Kristinn Jakobsson (Iceland)
26 August 2010
18:00

Marítimo (Portugal)	1–2	(Belarus) BATE Borisov
Kanu 90+1'	Report	Pawlaw 52'; Skavysh 90+3'

Estádio dos Barreiros, Funchal
Attendance: 2,073
Referee: Euan Norris (Scotland)

BATE Borisov won 5–1 on aggregate.

19 August 2010
20:30

Lausanne-Sport (Switzerland)	1–1	(Russia) Lokomotiv Moscow
Traoré 28'	Report	Sychev 65'

Stade Olympique de la Pontaise, Lausanne
Attendance: 11,200
Referee: Gediminas Mažeika (Lithuania)
26 August 2010
18:00

Lokomotiv Moscow (Russia)	1–1 (a.e.t.)	(Switzerland) Lausanne-Sport
Aliyev 85'	Report	Sílvio 17'
Penalties
Aliyev (penalty scored); Sychev (penalty scored); Loskov (penalty scored); Shishkin (penalty missed); Maicon (penalty missed)	3–4	(penalty scored) Sílvio; (penalty scored) Carrupt; (penalty scored) Rodrigo; (penalty missed) Katz; (penalty scored) Celestini

Lokomotiv Stadium, Moscow
Attendance: 11,053
Referee: Aleksandar Stavrev (Macedonia)

2–2 on aggregate; Lausanne-Sport won 4–3 on penalties.

19 August 2010
21:00

Győri ETO (Hungary)	0–2	(Croatia) Dinamo Zagreb
	Report	Rukavina 19', 28'

ETO Park, Győr
Attendance: 8,500
Referee: Stephan Studer (Switzerland)
26 August 2010
21:00

Dinamo Zagreb (Croatia)	2–1	(Hungary) Győri ETO
Sammir 45+2' (pen.), 84' (pen.)	Report	Ceolin 17'

Stadion Maksimir, Zagreb
Attendance: 5,538
Referee: Andre Marriner (England)

Dinamo Zagreb won 4–1 on aggregate.

19 August 2010
19:05

Odense (Denmark)	2–1	(Scotland) Motherwell
Sørensen 31'; Utaka 78'	Report	Hateley 90+4'

TRE-FOR Park, Odense
Attendance: 5,127
Referee: Zsolt Szabo (Hungary)
26 August 2010
20:45

Motherwell (Scotland)	0–1	(Denmark) Odense
	Report	Utaka 28'

Fir Park, Motherwell
Attendance: 9,105
Referee: Michael Koukoulakis (Greece)

Odense won 3–1 on aggregate.

19 August 2010
20:30

PAOK (Greece)	1–0	(Turkey) Fenerbahçe
Vieirinha 19'	Report

Toumba Stadium, Thessaloniki
Attendance: 23,213
Referee: Manuel Gräfe (Germany)
26 August 2010
20:45

Fenerbahçe (Turkey)	1–1 (a.e.t.)	(Greece) PAOK
Belözoğlu 51'	Report	Muslimović 102'

Şükrü Saracoğlu Stadium, Istanbul
Attendance: 39,863
Referee: Paolo Tagliavento (Italy)

PAOK won 2–1 on aggregate.

19 August 2010
22:00

Villarreal (Spain)	5–0	(Belarus) Dnepr Mogilev
Marchena 10'; Cazorla 17'; Valero 35'; Cani 45'; Nilmar 75'	Report

Estadio El Madrigal, Villarreal
Attendance: 7,913
Referee: Simon Lee Evans (Wales)
26 August 2010
18:00

Dnepr Mogilev (Belarus)	1–2	(Spain) Villarreal
Yurchenko 19'	Report	Nilmar 45+1'; Ruben 90+1'

Spartak Stadium, Mogilev
Attendance: 6,542
Referee: Fırat Aydınus (Turkey)

Villarreal won 7–1 on aggregate.

19 August 2010
21:00

Timișoara (Romania)	0–1	(England) Manchester City
	Report	Balotelli 72'

Stadionul Dan Păltinișanu, Timișoara
Attendance: 24,695
Referee: Florian Meyer (Germany)
26 August 2010
21:00

Manchester City (England)	2–0	(Romania) Timișoara
Wright-Phillips 43'; Boyata 59'	Report

City of Manchester Stadium, Manchester
Attendance: 23,542
Referee: Jorge Sousa (Portugal)

Manchester City won 3–0 on aggregate.
