= Felipe Benevides =

Brazilian footballer (born 1989)

Personal information
- Date of birth: March 1, 1989 (age 37)
- Place of birth: Brazil
- Height: 1.74 m (5 ft 8 1/2 in)
- Position: Midfielder

Team information
- Current team: MP
- Number: 19

Senior career*
Years	Team	Apps	(Gls)
2009–2010	MyPa	15	(0)
2009	MP (loan)	7	(4)
2011–	MP	2	(0)
- * Club domestic league appearances and goals as of 12 July 2010

Felipe Benevides (born 1 March 1989) is a Brazilian footballer who currently plays for MyPa in Finnish Veikkausliiga.
