= Dzmitry Turlin =

Belarusian footballer

Personal information
- Date of birth: 8 September 1985 (age 41)
- Place of birth: Bobruisk, Mogilev Oblast, Byelorussian SSR, Soviet Union
- Height: 1.75 m (5 ft 9 in)
- Position: Midfielder

Team information
- Current team: Belshina Bobruisk (assistant coach)

Youth career
- 2001–2002: Belshina Bobruisk

Senior career*
Years	Team	Apps	(Gls)
2002–2005	Belshina Bobruisk	24	(0)
2004	→ Dnepr Rogachev (loan)	13	(2)
2006	Kommunalnik Slonim	23	(3)
2007–2008	Belshina Bobruisk	46	(6)
2009–2010	Dnepr Mogilev	36	(6)
2011–2012	Belshina Bobruisk	45	(2)
2013	Gorodeya	6	(0)
2013–2014	Khimik Svetlogorsk	28	(5)
2014–2015	Belshina Bobruisk	37	(4)
2016	Naftan Novopolotsk	3	(0)
2016–2019	Belshina Bobruisk	65	(8)

Managerial career
- 2020–: Belshina Bobruisk (assistant)
- * Club domestic league appearances and goals

Dzmitry Turlin (Belarusian: Дзмітрый Турлін; Russian: Дмитрий Турлин; born 8 September 1985) is a Belarusian former professional footballer.

== Career ==
Turlin appeared in eight matches in the preliminary rounds of the 2010–11 UEFA Europa League, including the playoff round against Villarreal.
