= Guðmundur Reynir Gunnarsson =

Icelandic footballer (born 1989)

Personal information
- Full name: Guðmundur Reynir Gunnarsson
- Date of birth: 21 January 1989 (age 37)
- Place of birth: Iceland
- Height: 1.78 m (5 ft 10 in)
- Position: Left back

Youth career
- KR

Senior career*
| Years | Team | Apps | (Gls) |
| 2006–2008 | KR | 42 | (3) |
| 2008–2009 | GAIS | 4 | (0) |
| 2009–2015 | KR | 98 | (5) |
| 2015 | → Víkingur Ólafsvík (loan) | 22 | (0) |

International career
| 2005 | Iceland U-17 | 7 | (3) |
| 2007–2008 | Iceland U-19 | 9 | (3) |
| 2008–2011 | Iceland U-21 | 3 | (0) |
| 2008–2010 | Iceland | 3 | (0) |
- * Club domestic league appearances and goals

Guðmundur Reynir Gunnarsson (born 21 January 1989) is a retired Icelandic football player who mostly played as a left back for Icelandic football club KR.
