= Mikkel Cramer =

Danish footballer (born 1992)

Personal information
- Full name: Mikkel Engvang Cramer
- Date of birth: 25 January 1992 (age 34)
- Place of birth: Denmark
- Height: 1.84 m (6 ft 1/2 in)
- Positions: Left back; left winger

Youth career
- Sønderhald IF
- Randers Freja

Senior career*
Years	Team	Apps	(Gls)
2011–2013	Randers FC	20	(3)
2012–2013	→ AB (loan)	11	(0)
2013–2014	AC Horsens	3	(0)
2014–2016	Skive IK	42	(1)
2016–2018	Silkeborg IF	31	(0)

International career
2010	Denmark U19	7	(0)
- * Club domestic league appearances and goals as of 1 October 2018

Mikkel Engvang Cramer (born 25 January 1992) is a Danish retired footballer who played as a left back.
