= Tim Heinz =

Luxembourgish footballer

Personal information
- Date of birth: 5 February 1984 (age 42)
- Position: Defender

Senior career*
Years	Team	Apps	(Gls)
2004–2005	Etzella Ettelbruck	16	(0)
2006–2016	CS Grevenmacher	201	(8)

International career^{‡}
2005–2007	Luxembourg	6	(0)
- * Club domestic league appearances and goals as of 27 June 2023 ‡ National team caps and goals as of 14 January 2010

Tim Heinz (born 5 February 1984) is a former Luxembourgish footballer who last played as a defender for CS Grevenmacher in Luxembourg's domestic National Division.
