= Renato (footballer, born 1984) =

Brazilian footballer

Personal information
- Full name: Renato Alves Gomides
- Date of birth: May 12, 1984 (age 42)
- Place of birth: Goiás, Brazil
- Height: 1.83 m (6 ft 0 in)
- Position: Defender

Team information
- Current team: NK Široki Brijeg
- Number: 3

Senior career*
Years	Team	Apps	(Gls)
2004	Veranópolis		
2005–2006	NK Široki Brijeg		
2006–2007	NK Imotski	27	(2)
2007–2009	NK Inter Zaprešić		
2009–	NK Široki Brijeg		
- * Club domestic league appearances and goals

Renato Alves Gomides (born 12 May 1984 in Goias) is a former Brazilian football player. He played for NK Široki Brijeg in Široki Brijeg, Bosnia and Herzegovina.
