= Vlado Zadro =

Bosnian footballer (born 1987)

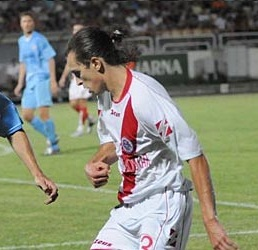

Personal information
- Date of birth: 17 March 1987 (age 39)
- Place of birth: Mostar, SR Bosnia, SFR Yugoslavia
- Position: Midfielder

Youth career
- Široki Brijeg

Senior career*
Years	Team	Apps	(Gls)
2006–2011	Zrinjski Mostar	64	(6)
2012–2013	NK Zagreb	18	(0)
2013	FK Sarajevo	3	(0)
2013	Solin	7	(0)
2013–2014	Široki Brijeg	15	(1)
2015	Toronto Croatia		
Total		105	(6)

International career
- Bosnia and Herzegovina U21
- * Club domestic league appearances and goals

Vlado Zadro (born 17 March 1987) is a Bosnian-Herzegovinian former professional footballer who played as a midfielder.

== Career ==
Zadro began his career in 2005 with Zrinjski Mostar in the Premier League of Bosnia and Herzegovina. During his tenure with Mostar his achievements included a league title, and the Bosnia and Herzegovina Football Cup. He featured in the 2009–10 UEFA Champions League against Slovan Bratislava, and also participated in the 2010–11 UEFA Europa League. In 2012, he signed with NK Zagreb of the Croatian First Football League, where he appeared in total of 18 matches. He returned to Bosnia in 2013 with play with FK Sarajevo.

Following a season in Bosnia he returned to Croatia to play in the Croatian Second Football League with NK Solin. After a short spell abroad he returned home to sign with Široki Brijeg. During his time with Brijeg he featured in the 2014–15 UEFA Europa League against Mladá Boleslav. In 2015, he went overseas to play in the Canadian Soccer League with Toronto Croatia.
