= Kanú (footballer, born 1983) =

Brazilian footballer

Personal information
- Full name: Elias de Oliveira Rosa
- Date of birth: 8 February 1983 (age 43)
- Place of birth: Boa Esperança, Brazil
- Height: 1.73 m (5 ft 8 in)
- Position: Winger

Senior career*
Years	Team	Apps	(Gls)
2001–2005	Cruzeiro	7	(0)
2005	→ Ipatinga (loan)		
2005–2011	Marítimo B	7	(4)
2005–2011	Marítimo	82	(14)
2011–2012	Al-Ittihad Kalba	10	(6)
2012–2013	Al Khaleej		
2013	Nacional-MG	7	(1)
2013–2015	Al-Tadamun		
2015–2016	Al-Jahra		
2016	Al-Muharraq	22	(10)
2016	Al-Arabi	6	(1)
- * Club domestic league appearances and goals

Elias de Oliveira Rosa (born 8 February 1983), known as Kanú, is a Brazilian former professional footballer who played as a right winger.

== Football career ==
Born in Boa Esperança, Minas Gerais, Kanú started playing professionally with Cruzeiro Esporte Clube, but only appeared in seven Série A games over the course of three seasons. In 2005, he was loaned to Série C club Ipatinga Esporte Clube.

Kanú moved to Portugal for 2005–06, joining C.S. Marítimo in the Primeira Liga. He made his debut in the competition on 18 September 2005, starting and playing 64 minutes in a 2–2 home draw against F.C. Penafiel. Precisely during that campaign, he scored a career-best eight goals (from 25 games) to help his team finish in tenth position.

On 22 July 2010, Kanú contributed with one goal to a 3–2 away win over Sporting Fingal F.C. for the third qualifying round of the UEFA Europa League (6–4 on aggregate). He left the island of Madeira in late January of the following year, taking his game to the United Arab Emirates and Kuwait, this being interspersed with a brief spell back in his country with amateurs Nacional Esporte Clube (MG).
