= Pablo =

- Gender: male

Origin
- Origin: Spain
- Region of origin: Spain and other Hispanic countries

Other names
- Related names: Paul, Pavel, Paweł, Pavol, Paolo, Paulo

Pablo is a masculine given name, the Spanish form of the name Paul.

== People ==
=== Given name ===
- Pablo Acha (born 1996), Spanish archer
- Pablo Agüero (born 1977), Argentine-French filmmaker
- Pablo Aimar (born 1979), Argentine footballer
- Pablo Alarcón (born 1946), Argentine actor
- Pablo Alborán (born 1989), Spanish singer
- Pablo Almeida (born 1993), Brazilian politician
- Pablo Armero (born 1986), Colombian footballer
- Pablo Bartholomew (born 1955), Indian photojournalist
- Pablo Berger (born 1963), Spanish film director and screenwriter
- Pablo de Blasis (born 1988), Argentine footballer
- Pablo Brandán (born 1983), Argentine footballer
- Pablo Brenes (born 1982), Costa Rican footballer
- Pablo Bueno (born 1990), Argentine footballer
- Pablo Cabrera (born 1997), American baseball coach
- Pablo Carreño Busta (born 1991), Spanish tennis player
- Pablo Casals (1876–1973), Catalan cello virtuoso
- Pablo Cavallero (born 1974), Argentine retired footballer
- Pablo de Coronel (1480–1534), Spanish Hebraist and professor of Hebrew
- Pablo Couñago (born 1979), Spanish footballer
- Pablo Cuevas (born 1986), Uruguayan tennis player
- Pablo Virgilio David (born 1959), Filipino cardinal, current Bishop of Kalookan
- Pablo Echarri (born 1969), Argentine actor
- Pablo Eisenberg (1932–2022), American scholar, social justice advocate, and tennis player
- Pablo Escobar (1949–1993), Colombian drug lord
- Pablo Francisco (born 1974), Chilean American comedian
- Pablo Galdames (footballer, born 1974), Chilean footballer
- Pablo García (footballer, born 2006), Spanish footballer
- Pablo P. Garcia (1925–2021), Filipino politician
- Pablo Granados (born 1965), Argentine comedian
- Pablo Hernández (disambiguation)
- Pablo Ibáñez (born 1981), Spanish footballer
- Pablo Iglesias (disambiguation)
- Pablo Lanz (born 1979), Argentine retired footballer
- Pablo Lavallén (born 1972), Argentine football manager
- Pablo Lombi (born 1969), Argentine field hockey player
- Pablo López (footballer, born 1982), Argentine former footballer
- Pablo Lorenzini (1949–2025), Chilean politician
- Pablo Lopez (disambiguation), also López
- Pablo Lucero (1800–1856), Argentine statesman
- Pablo Lugo (1932–2024), Puerto Rican boxer
- Pablo Manzoni (1939–2022), Italian make-up artist known professionally as Pablo of Elizabeth Arden
- Pablo Meana (born 1975), Argentine volleyball player
- Pablo Medina, Cuban-American poet, novelist, and professor
- Pablo Medina Velázquez (c. 1961–2014), Paraguayan assassinated investigative journalist
- Pablo Mills (born 1984), British former footballer
- Pablo Miyazawa, Brazilian journalist and editor
- Pablo Moret (1933–2025), Argentine actor
- Pablo Neruda (1904–1973), Chilean poet and politician, Nobel Prize laureate for Literature
- Pablo Olmedo (athlete) (born 1975), Mexican middle- and long-distance runner
- Pablo Olmedo (footballer) (1929–1980), Spanish footballer and coach
- Pablo d'Ors (born 1963), Spanish priest, theologian and writer
- Pablo Ortiz (disambiguation)
- Pablo Palitos (1906–1989), Argentine-Spanish actor
- Pablo Paz (born 1973), Argentine retired footballer
- Pablo Pérez (footballer, born 1985), Argentine midfielder
- Pablo Picasso (1881–1973), Spanish painter, sculptor, and co-founder of cubism
- Pablo Prigioni (born 1977), Argentine National Basketball Association assistant coach and former player
- Pablo Rago (born 1972), Argentine actor
- Pablo Ramírez, Mexican former footballer and Spanish-language sportscaster in the United States
- Pablo Ramirez (skateboarder) (1993–2019), Dominican-American skateboarder
- Pablo Rodríguez (footballer, born 1977), Argentine retired footballer
- Pablo Salinas (born 1979), Bolivian footballer
- Pablo Sandoval (born 1986), Venezuelan Major League Baseball player
- Pablo Sarino (1911–1987), Filipino politician
- Pablo de Sarasate (1844–1908), Spanish violinist and composer
- Pablo Soto (footballer) (born 1995), Chilean former football goalkeeper
- Pablo Soto (software developer) (born 1979), Spanish computer specialist and politician
- Pablo Squella (born 1963), Chilean middle-distance runner and politician
- Pablo Urbina (born 1988), Spanish conductor
- Pablo Vegetti (born 1988), Argentine footballer
- Pablo Visconti, Argentine professor of reproductive biology
- Pablo Zabaleta (born 1985), Argentine former footballer

=== Mononym ===
- Pablo (footballer), several footballers
- Pablo (Filipino musician), stage name of Filipino singer, songwriter, rapper, dancer, record producer and leader of Pinoy pop boyband SB19 John Paulo Bagnas Nase (born 1994)

=== Surname ===
- Sofia Pablo, Filipino actress
- Michel Pablo (1911–1996), Greek political activist

== Fictional characters ==
- Pablo, from the children's television series The Backyardigans
- Pablo, from the European comic series The Adventures of Tintin
- Pablo the Drug Mule Dog, the dog used to smuggle drugs into the UK in an anti-cocaine advertising campaign
- Pablo Sanchez, an athletically talented boy in the Backyard Sports franchise

== See also ==
- Juan Pablo, a common Spanish given name
- Paula (given name), feminine form of Pablo
- Paolo (disambiguation)
- Paulo
- Paul (disambiguation)
- Pal (surname)
