= 2010–11 PFC Levski Sofia season =

Levski Sofia
2010–11 season
- Chairman: Todor Batkov
- Manager: Yasen Petrov
- A Group: 2nd
- Bulgarian Cup: Quarter-finals
- UEFA Europa League: Group stage
- Top goalscorer: League: Garra Dembele (25); All: Garra Dembele (36)
- Highest home attendance: 28,000 vs Gent (16 September 2010)
- Lowest home attendance: 500 vs Cherno More (17 April 2011)
Home colours	Away colours

The 2010–11 season is Levski Sofia's 89th season in the First League. This article shows player statistics and all matches (official and friendly) that the club has played during the 2010–11 season.

== Transfers ==
=== Summer transfers ===
In:

No.	Pos.	Nation	Player
2	DF	NED	Dustley Mulder (free agent, previous at (Netherlands) RKC Waalwijk)
3	MF	NED	Serginho Greene (free agent, previously at (Netherlands) Vitesse Arnhem)
5	DF	BUL	Ivo Ivanov (from Beroe Stara Zagora)
17	FW	BUL	Daniel Mladenov (from Pirin Blagoevgrad)
23	MF	NED	Andwélé Slory (free agent, previously at (England) W.B.A.)
26	DF	BUL	Kalin Shtarkov (from Chavdar Etropole)
28	FW	BUL	Aleksandar Kirov (loan return from Lokomotiv Mezdra)
29	FW	BUL	Ismail Isa (loan return from Lokomotiv Mezdra)
39	FW	FRA	Garra Dembélé (from Lokomotiv Plovdiv)
85	GK	BUL	Kiril Akalski (from Lokomotiv Plovdiv)

Out:

No.	Pos.	Nation	Player
2	DF	BUL	Victor Genev (to Slavia Sofia)
8	MF	BUL	Georgi Sarmov (to (Turkey) Kasımpaşa)
11	DF	BUL	Elin Topuzakov (to (Israel) Hapoel Ramat Gan)
18	FW	BUL	Georgi Hristov (to Slavia Sofia)
19	FW	BUL	Miroslav Antonov (on loan at Montana)
19	FW	BUL	Ivan Tsachev (to Slavia Sofia)
21	DF	SVK	Peter Petráš (end of contract, free transfer to (Slovakia) Tatran Prešov)
23	DF	CZE	David Bystroň (to (Czech Republic) Viktoria Plzeň)
24	FW	BUL	Nikolay Dimitrov (to (Turkey) Kasımpaşa)
27	FW	FRA	Cedric Bardon (released, free transfer to (France) ES Fréjus)
32	MF	BUL	Dimitar Telkiyski (to (Israel) Hapoel Ramat Gan)
44	FW	BUL	Boyan Tabakov (on loan at Lyubimetz)
70	MF	SRB	Saša Simonović (end of contract)
77	FW	BUL	Enyo Krastovchev (end of contract)

See List of Bulgarian football transfers summer 2010

=== Winter transfers ===
In:

No.	Pos.	Nation	Player
6	MF	BEL	Jeanvion Yulu-Matondo (from (Netherlands) Roda JC)
8	MF	BUL	Daniel Dimov (from Cherno More Varna)
11	DF	MNE	Marko Vidovic (from (Cyprus) Anorthosis)
23	GK	BUL	Plamen Iliev (from Vidima-Rakovski)

Out:

No.	Pos.	Nation	Player
1	GK	BUL	Georgi Petkov (to (Cyprus) Enosis Neon Paralimni FC)
6	MF	GHA	Michael Tawiah (on loan to Kaliakra Kavarna)
13	FW	BUL	Daniel Shmedin (on loan to Kaliakra Kavarna)
15	DF	MAR	Chakib Benzoukane (released)
20	MF	BRA	Joãozinho (to (Russia) Krasnodar)
23	MF	NED	Andwélé Slory (to (Australia) Adelaide United)
26	DF	BUL	Kalin Shtarkov (on loan to Vidima-Rakovski)
30	MF	BUL	Lachezar Baltanov (on loan to Kaliakra Kavarna)
31	GK	BUL	Tzvetan Dimitrov (to Kaliakra Kavarna)

See List of Bulgarian football transfers winter 2010–11.

== Squad ==
As of August 29, 2010 Note: Flags indicate national team as defined under FIFA eligibility rules; some limited exceptions apply. Players may hold more than one non-FIFA nationality.

No.	Pos.	Nation	Player
1	GK	BUL	Georgi Petkov
2	DF	NED	Dustley Mulder
3	MF	NED	Serginho Greene
4	DF	BUL	Stefan Stanchev
5	DF	BUL	Ivo Ivanov
6	MF	BEL	Jeanvion Yulu-Matondo
7	MF	BUL	Aleksandar Aleksandrov
8	MF	BUL	Daniel Dimov
10	MF	BUL	Hristo Yovov (Captain)
11	DF	MNE	Marko Vidovic
12	GK	BUL	Bozhidar Mitrev
14	DF	BUL	Veselin Minev

No.	Pos.	Nation	Player
16	MF	BUL	Marian Ognyanov
17	FW	BUL	Daniel Mladenov
22	MF	MKD	Darko Tasevski
23	GK	BUL	Plamen Iliev
28	FW	BUL	Aleksandar Kirov
29	FW	BUL	Ismail Isa
39	FW	FRA	Garra Dembélé
41	DF	BUL	Asen Georgiev
45	MF	BUL	Vladimir Gadzhev (Vice Captain)
55	DF	BUL	Yordan Miliev
57	FW	BUL	Todor Chavorski
85	GK	BUL	Kiril Akalski

== Statistics ==
=== Goalscorers ===
Player	League	Cup	Europa League	Total
(France) Garra Dembele	25	3	8	36
(Bulgaria) Daniel Mladenov	5	0	5	10
(Bulgaria) Ismail Isa	3	1	4	8
(Bulgaria) Hristo Yovov	6	0	1	7
(Brazil) Joazinho	2	0	2	4
(Bulgaria) Vladimir Gadzhev	2	1	1	4
(North Macedonia) Darko Tasevski	4	0	0	4
(Bulgaria) Alex	3	0	0	3
(Belgium) Jeanvion Yulu-Matondo	3	0	0	3
(Bulgaria) Mariyan Ognyanov	2	0	0	2
(Netherlands) Serginho Greene	1	0	1	2
(Bulgaria) Yordan Miliev	1	0	0	1
(Bulgaria) Ivo Ivanov	1	0	0	1
Total	58	5	22	85

=== Assists ===
Player	League	Cup	Europa League	Total
(North Macedonia) Darko Tasevski	8	0	5	13
(Brazil) Joazinho	7	0	5	12
(France) Garra Dembele	4	0	2	6
(Bulgaria) Daniel Mladenov	3	0	2	5
(Bulgaria) Veselin Minev	2	0	3	5
(Bulgaria) Hristo Yovov	4	0	0	4
(Bulgaria) Vladimir Gadzhev	3	0	0	3
(Bulgaria) Yordan Miliev	0	1	1	2
(Bulgaria) Ivo Ivanov	1	1	0	2
(Netherlands) Dustley Mulder	0	1	0	1
(Bulgaria) Mariyan Ognyanov	0	1	0	1

=== Cards ===
Player	Yellow card	Red card	Total
(Bulgaria) Veselin Minev	9	1	9
(France) Garra Dembele	7	0	7
(Netherlands) Dustley Mulder	6	0	6
(Bulgaria) Vladimir Gadzhev	6	1	7
(Bulgaria) Alex	4	1	5
(Bulgaria) Yordan Miliev	4	0	4
(Bulgaria) Ivo Ivanov	3	1	4
(North Macedonia) Darko Tasevski	2	1	3
(Bulgaria) Hristo Yovov	2	1	3

== Pre-season and friendlies ==
=== Summer ===
30 June 2010	Levski Sofia (Bulgaria)	2–3	(Romania) Târgu Mureş	Enzesfeld-Lindabrunn
	Mladenov 76' 79'	Report	Sfârlia 12'; Roman 47' 77'	Attendance: 50; Referee: Meier

1 July 2010	Levski Sofia (Bulgaria)	3–2	(Ukraine) Metalist Kharkiv	Enzesfeld-Lindabrunn
	Telkiyski 14'; Gadzhev 18'; Garra Dembele 47'	Report	Edmar 19'; Vorobey 80'

3 July 2010	Levski Sofia (Bulgaria)	0–1	(Israel) Hapoel Tel Aviv	Enzesfeld-Lindabrunn
		Report	Shechter 48'	Referee: Gerhard Gihauer

6 July 2010	Levski Sofia (Bulgaria)	0–1 (Interrupted)	(Cyprus) Apollon Limassol	Enzesfeld-Lindabrunn
		Report	Avraam 7'
Note: The match was interrupted at half-time.

8 July 2010	Austria Wien	2–1	(Bulgaria) Levski Sofia	Wien
14:00 EET	Linz 47'; Tiffner 87'	Report	Dembele 26'	Stadium: Franz Horr; Attendance: 4 000

4 September 2010	Levski Sofia	3–1	Montana	Sofia
19:00 EET	Alex 49'; Isa 55'; Chavorski 68'	Report	Luiz Eduardo 15'	Stadium: Georgi Asparuhov; Attendance: 1 000; Referee: Kalin Lyudmilov (Sofia)

9 October 2010	Levski Sofia	1–3	Chernomorets Burgas	Sofia
19:00 EET	Georgi Ivanov 29'	Report	Toshev 8'; Koita 43'; Andonov 81'	Stadium: Georgi Asparuhov; Attendance: 1 500; Referee: Tasko Taskov (Sofia)

=== Winter ===
26 January 2011	Alexandroupoli Enosi (Greece)	0–4	(Bulgaria) Levski Sofia	Alexandroupoli
EET		Report	Dembélé 28'; Gadzhev 49' (pen.); Kirov 74'; Antonov 87'	Stadium: Fotis Kosmas Stadium; Attendance: 120

6 February 2011	Levski Sofia (Bulgaria)	2–2	(Slovakia) Dubnica	Ayia Napa
EET	Hristo Popadiyn 35'; Isa 83'	Report	Bruško 45' (pen.); Gorelka 90'	Attendance: 50

7 February 2011	Levski Sofia (Bulgaria)	1–0	(Poland) Bełchatów	Ayia Napa
EET	Vidovic 85'	Report		Attendance: 30

9 February 2011	Levski Sofia (Bulgaria)	2–1	(Czech Republic) Teplice	Ayia Napa
EET	Isa 13' 61'	Report	Došek 50'

11 February 2011	Levski Sofia (Bulgaria)	3–1	(Russia) Dynamo Moscow	Ayia Napa
EET	Tasevski 2'; Matondo 16'; Dembele 33'	Report	Kuranyi 3'

15 February 2011	Levski Sofia (Bulgaria)	1–2	(Czech Republic) Viktoria Plzeň	Ayia Napa
EET	Matondo 16'	Report	Horváth 8'; Rezek 55' (pen.)

17 February 2011	Levski Sofia (Bulgaria)	2–2	(Romania) Oţelul Galaţi	Ayia Napa
EET	Dembélé 28' (pen.); Gadzhev 85' (pen.)	Report	Iorga 18' (pen.); Pena 65'

20 February 2011	Levski Sofia	3–0	Chavdar Etropole	Sofia
EET	Isa 15'; Ivanov 41'; Vidovic 62'	Report		Stadium: Georgi Asparuhov; Attendance: 1 500; Referee: Zahariev

== Competitions ==
=== A Group ===
==== Table ====
Pos	Team	Pld	W	D	L	GF	GA	GD	Pts	Qualification or relegation
1	Litex Lovech (C)	30	23	6	1	56	13	+43	75	Qualification for Champions League second qualifying round
2	Levski Sofia	30	23	3	4	67	24	+43	72	Qualification for Europa League third qualifying round
3	CSKA Sofia	30	18	7	5	53	26	+27	61	Qualification for Europa League play-off round (Note: CSKA Sofia have won the 2010–11 Bulgarian Cup competition and therefore qualified for the play-off round of the 2011–12 UEFA Europa League.)
4	Lokomotiv Sofia	30	16	4	10	47	33	+14	52 (Note: Lokomotiv Sofia ahead of Lokomotiv Plovdiv on head-to-head record; Lokomotiv Sofia–Lokomotiv Plovdiv 3–0, Lokomotiv Plovdiv–Lokomotiv Sofia 0–0.)	Qualification for Europa League second qualifying round
5	Lokomotiv Plovdiv	30	14	10	6	54	28	+26	52	

Source: A PFG (in Bulgarian)
Rules for classification: 1st points; 2nd head-to-head points; 3rd head-to-head goal difference; 4th head-to-head goals scored; 5th head-to-head away goals scored; 6th goal difference; 7th goals scored
(C) Champions

==== Results summary ====
Overall								Home						Away					
Pld	W	D	L	GF	GA	GD	Pts	W	D	L	GF	GA	GD	W	D	L	GF	GA	GD
30	23	3	4	67	24	+43	72	13	0	2	36	8	+28	10	3	2	31	16	+15

Last updated: 24 April 2011.
Source: Soccerway

==== Results by round ====
Round	1	2	3	4	5	6	7	8	9	10	11	12	13	14	15	16	17	18	19	20	21	22	23	24	25	26	27	28	29	30
Ground	A	H	A	H	A	H	A	H	A	H	A	H	A	H	A	H	A	H	A	H	A	H	A	H	A	H	A	H	A	H
Result	W	W	L	W	W	W	W	W	D	W	L	L	D	W	W	L	W	W	W	W	D	W	W	W	W	W	W	W	W	W
Position	3	1	4	2	2	1	1	1	1	1	2	2	2	2	2	2	2	2	2	2	2	2	2	2	2	2	2	2	2	2

A = Away; H = Home; W = Win; D = Draw; L = Loss

==== Fixtures and results ====
1 August 2010 1	CSKA Sofia	0–1	Levski Sofia	Sofia
21:00 EEST	Grandin (yellow card) 62'; Marquinhos (yellow card) 19' (yellow-red card) 90+3'	Report	Dembélé 39'; Minev (yellow card) 27'; Petkov (yellow card) 59'; Gadzhev (yellow card) 61' (yellow-red card) 81'; Topuzakov (yellow card) 84'; Yovov (yellow card) 89'	Stadium: Vasil Levski; Attendance: 12,300; Referee: Stanislav Todorov (Shumen)

9 August 2010 2	Levski Sofia	3–1	Lokomotiv Sofia	Sofia
21:00 EEST	Dembélé 45', 74', 79' (pen.)	Report	Yordanov 81'	Stadium: Georgi Asparuhov; Attendance: 5,000; Referee: Stefan Spasov (Pernik)

15 August 2010 3	Chernomorets Burgas	2–1	Levski Sofia	Burgas
20:00 EEST	Andonov 29'; André 61'	Report	Aleks 77'	Stadium: Lazur; Attendance: 15,483; Referee: Nikolay Yordanov (Sofia)

22 August 2010 4	Levski Sofia	3–0	Kaliakra Kavarna	Sofia
21:00 EEST	Petrov 40' (o.g.); Aleks 89' (pen.); Isa 90'	Report		Stadium: Georgi Asparuhov; Attendance: 1,000; Referee: Nikola Popov (Sofia)

29 August 2010 5	Vidima-Rakovski	1–2	Levski Sofia	Sevlievo
18:00 EEST	Zakov 90'	Report	Dembele 55' (pen.); Darko Tasevski 77'	Stadium: Rakovski; Attendance: 3,500; Referee: Aleksandar Kostadinov (Sofia)

12 September 2010 6	Levski Sofia	4–0	Minyor Pernik	Sofia
19:00	Joazinho 1'; Dembele 20' 39' 45' (pen.)	Report		Stadium: Georgi Asparuhov

20 September 2010 7	Cherno More	2–3	Levski Sofia	Varna
16:00	Bozhilov 49'; Iliev 83'	Report	Mladenov 22'; Miliev 30'; Dembele 64' (pen.)	Stadium: Ticha; Attendance: 10,000; Referee: Nikolay Yordanov (Sofia)

26 September 2010 8	Levski Sofia	2–1	Beroe	Sofia
21:00	Dembele 21'; Yovov 36'	Report	Dimitrov 34'	Stadium: Georgi Asparuhov; Attendance: 4,000; Referee: Atanas Dimitrov (Sliven)

4 October 2010 9	Sliven	1–1	Levski Sofia	Sliven
15:00	Ignatov 70'	Report	Tasevski 29'	Stadium: Hadzhi Dimitar; Attendance: 5,000; Referee: Georgi Yordanov (Gabrovo)

16 October 2010 10	Levski Sofia	4–1	Pirin Blagoevgrad	Sofia
19:00	Dembele 33', 51', 75'; Ognyanov 56'	Report	Kondev 4'	Stadium: Georgi Asparuhov; Attendance: 3,000; Referee: Georgi Dimitrov (Sofia)

25 October 2010 11	Litex Lovech	2–1	Levski Sofia	Lovech
20:00	Yanev 29'; Todorov 89'	Report	Dembele 11'	Stadium: Lovech; Attendance: 7,000; Referee: Stanislav Todorov (Shumen)

30 October 2010 12	Levski Sofia	1–2	Lokomotiv Plovdiv	Sofia
18:00	Ognyanov 75'	Report	Lazarov 17'; De Carvalho 34'	Stadium: Georgi Asparuhov; Attendance: 4,000; Referee: Ivaylo Stoyanov (Petrich)

7 November 2010 13	Slavia Sofia	2–2	Levski Sofia	Sofia
14:00	Bozhov 28'; Ivanov 44'	Report	Greene 27'; Joazinho 88' (pen.)	Stadium: Ovcha Kupel; Attendance: 7,000; Referee: Anton Genov (Sofia)

13 November 2010 14	Levski Sofia	1–0	Akademik Sofia	Sofia
14:00	Isa 45'	Report		Stadium: Georgi Asparuhov; Attendance: 1,000; Referee: Kalin Lyudmilov (Sofia)

27 November 2010 15	Montana	0–3	Levski Sofia	Montana
14:00 EET		Report	Mladenov 26'; Dembele 61', 90+2'	Stadium: Ogosta; Attendance: 4,000; Referee: Ivaylo Stoyanov (Sofia)

26 February 2011 16	Levski Sofia	1–3	CSKA Sofia	Sofia
18:00 EET	Stoyanov 74' (o.g.)	Report	Michel Platini 33', 48'; Popov 65'	Stadium: Georgi Asparuhov; Attendance: 20,000; Referee: Anton Genov (Sofia)

6 March 2011 17	Lokomotiv Sofia	0–2	Levski Sofia	Sofia
18:00 EET		Report	Dembele 17'; Dimitrov 45+2' (o.g.)	Stadium: Vasil Levski; Attendance: 2,000; Referee: Nikolay Yordanov (Sofia)

12 March 2011 18	Levski Sofia	1–0	Chernomorets Burgas	Sofia
18:00 EET	Tasevski 72'	Report		Stadium: Georgi Asparuhov; Attendance: 4,000; Referee: Radan Miryanov (Varna)

19 March 2011 19	Kaliakra Kavarna	0–3 (w/o)	Levski Sofia	Kavarna
18:00 EET				Stadium: Kaliakra
Note: Match awarded due to the refusal of Kaliakra to play.

2 April 2011 20	Levski Sofia	2–0	Vidima-Rakovski	Sofia
21:00 EET	Dembele 55' (pen.); Isa 68'	Report		Stadium: Georgi Asparuhov; Attendance: 500; Referee: Stoyan Denev

10 April 2011 21	Minyor Pernik	0–0	Levski Sofia	Pernik
15:00 EET		Report		Stadium: Minyor; Attendance: 8,000; Referee: Ivaylo Stoyanov

17 April 2011 22	Levski Sofia	1–0	Cherno More	Sofia
21:00 EET	Ivanov 57'	Report		Stadium: Georgi Asparuhov; Attendance: 500; Referee: Nikola Popov

24 April 2011 23	Beroe	2–3	Levski Sofia	Stara Zagora
15:00 EET	Yordanov 50'; Zlatinov 74' (pen.)	Report	Yovov 6'; Aleks 60'; Matondo 84'	Stadium: Beroe; Attendance: 4,500; Referee: Tasko Taskov

1 May 2011 24	Levski Sofia	5–0	Sliven	Sofia
21:00 EET	Dembele 9', 29', 87'; Matondo 25'; Mladenov 75'	Report		Stadium: Georgi Asparuhov; Attendance: 2,000; Referee: Aleksandar Kostadinov

4 May 2011 25	Pirin Blagoevgrad	2–3	Levski Sofia	Blagoevgrad
16:00 EET	Tsvetkov 6' 83' (pen.)	Report	Matondo 33'; Dembélé 66'; Yovov 78'	Stadium: Pirin; Attendance: 6,000; Referee: Radan Miryanov

8 May 2011 26	Levski Sofia	2–0	Litex Lovech	Sofia
21:00 EET	Dembele 76'; Yovov 90'	Report		Stadium: Georgi Asparuhov; Attendance: 7,000; Referee: Peter Wink

14 May 2011 27	Lokomotiv Plovdiv	2–3	Levski Sofia	Plovdiv
18:00 EET	de Carvahlo 20'; Lazarov 90+4' (pen.)	Report	Tasevski 47'; Dembélé 79' (pen.), 83'	Stadium: Lauta; Attendance: 12,000; Referee: Ivaylo Stoyanov (Petrich)

18 May 2011 28	Levski Sofia	3–0	Slavia	Sofia
18:00 EET	Yovov 40', 86'; Gadzhev 67'	Report		Stadium: Georgi Asparuhov; Attendance: 3,500; Referee: Ahmed Ahmed

21 May 2011 29	Akademik Sofia	0–3	Levski Sofia	Sofia
18:00 EET		Report	Gadzhev 32'; Mladenov 84', 90'	Stadium: Ovcha Kupel; Attendance: 1,500; Referee: Kolyo Danev

28 May 2010 30	Levski Sofia	3–0	Montana	Sofia
18:00 EET	Minev 31'; Dembele 65'; Yovov 66'	Report		Stadium: Vasil Levski; Attendance: 2,500; Referee: Ivan Kirilov

=== Bulgarian Cup ===
20 November 2010 Second round	Bansko	1–3	Levski Sofia	Bansko
14:00 EEST	Petkov 63'	Report	Dembele 26', 76'; Shopov 31' (o.g.)	Stadium: St Petar; Attendance: 6,000; Referee: Nikolay Yordanov (Sofia)

8 December 2010 Third round	Levski Sofia	1–0	Beroe	Sofia
16:00 EEST	Gadzhev 83'	Report		Stadium: Georgi Asparuhov; Attendance: 1,000; Referee: Ahmed Ahmed

6 April 2011 Quarterfinal	Litex Lovech	1–1 (4–2 p)	Levski Sofia	Lovech
18:00 EEST	Tom 36' (pen.)	Report	Dembélé 79'	Stadium: Lovech; Attendance: 6,000; Referee: (Denmark) Lars Christoffersen
	Penalties
	Tom (penalty scored); Doka (penalty missed); Djermanović (penalty scored); Todorov (penalty scored); Zanev (penalty scored)		(penalty scored) Dembélé; (penalty missed) Aleks; (penalty scored) Ognyanov; (penalty missed) Isa

=== UEFA Europa League ===
==== Second qualifying round ====
15 July 2010 1st leg	Levski Sofia (Bulgaria)	6–0	(Republic of Ireland) Dundalk	Sofia
20:45 EEST	Yovov 12'; Mladenov 14', 46'; Dembele 42'; Isa 85', 90'	Report		Stadium: Georgi Asparuhov; Attendance: 10,000; Referee: Daniele Orsato (Italy)

22 July 2010 2nd leg	Dundalk (Republic of Ireland)	0–2 (0−8 agg.)	(Bulgaria) Levski Sofia	Dundalk, Ireland
17:00 WEST		Report	Garra Dembele 4', 33'	Stadium: Oriel Park; Attendance: 1,500; Referee: Farit Aidonus (Turkey)

==== Third qualifying round ====
29 July 2010 1st leg	Kalmar FF (Sweden)	1–1	(Bulgaria) Levski Sofia	Kalmar, Sweden
19:30 WEST	Dauda 83'	Report	Joazinho 28'	Stadium: Fredriksskans; Referee: Boško Jovanetić (Serbia)

5 August 2010 2nd leg	Levski Sofia (Bulgaria)	5–2 (6−3 agg.)	(Sweden) Kalmar FF	Sofia, Bulgaria
19:45	Dembélé 12', 70'; Mladenov 33'; Isa 90+1', 90+2'	Report	Johansson 82'; Israelsson 84'	Stadium: Georgi Asparuhov Stadium; Attendance: 15,000; Referee: Antony Gautier (France)

==== Play-off round ====
19 August 2010 1st leg	AIK (Sweden)	0–0	(Bulgaria) Levski Sofia	Stockholm, Sweden
19:00 WEST		Report		Stadium: Råsunda Stadium; Attendance: 8,212; Referee: Pavel Kralovec (Czech Republic)

26 August 2010 2nd leg	Levski Sofia (Bulgaria)	2–1 (2−1 agg.)	(Sweden) AIK	Sofia, Bulgaria
19:30	Mladenov 49'; Dembélé 51'	Report	Bangura 11'	Stadium: Georgi Asparuhov Stadium; Attendance: 25,000; Referee: Viktor Shvetsov (Ukraine)

==== Group stage ====
Pos	Team	Pld	W	D	L	GF	GA	GD	Pts	Qualification	SCP	LIL	GNT	LS
1	(Portugal) Sporting CP	6	4	0	2	14	6	+8	12	Advance to knockout phase	—	1–0	5–1	5–0
2	(France) Lille	6	2	2	2	8	6	+2	8	Advance to knockout phase	1–2	—	3–0	1–0
3	(Belgium) Gent	6	2	1	3	8	13	−5	7		3–1	1–1	—	1–0
4	(Bulgaria) Levski Sofia	6	2	1	3	6	11	−5	7		1–0	2–2	3–2	—

Source: Soccerway

16 September 2010 1	Levski Sofia (Bulgaria)	3–2	(Belgium) Gent	Sofia, Bulgaria
19:00	Joãozinho 42'; Dembélé 60'; Greene 84'	Report	Azofeifa 23'; Šuler 48'	Stadium: Georgi Asparuhov Stadium; Attendance: 28,000; Referee: Zsolt Szabó (Hungary)

30 September 2010 2	Sporting CP (Portugal)	5–0	(Bulgaria) Levski Sofia	Lisbon, Portugal
21:05	Carriço 30'; Maniche 43'; Salomão 53'; Postiga 61'; Fernández 79'	Report		Stadium: Estádio José Alvalade; Attendance: 15,081; Referee: Sascha Kever (Switzerland)

21 October 2010 3	Lille (France)	1–0	(Bulgaria) Levski Sofia	Villeneuve-d'Ascq, France
21:05	Chedjou 49'	Report		Stadium: Stadium Nord Lille Métropole; Attendance: 14,646; Referee: Kristinn Jakobsson (Iceland)

4 November 2010 4	Levski Sofia (Bulgaria)	2–2	(France) Lille	Sofia, Bulgaria
19:00	Dembélé 11'; Gadzhev 82'	Report	de Melo 35'; Ivanov 88' (o.g.)	Stadium: Georgi Asparuhov Stadium; Attendance: 25,000; Referee: Milorad Mažić (Serbia)

1 December 2010 5	Gent (Belgium)	1–0	(Bulgaria) Levski Sofia	Ghent, Belgium
21:05	Wallace 77'	Report		Stadium: Jules Ottenstadion; Attendance: 10,000; Referee: Tommy Skjerven (Norway)

16 December 2010 6	Levski Sofia (Bulgaria)	1–0	(Portugal) Sporting CP	Sofia, Bulgaria
19:00	Mladenov 45'	Report		Stadium: Georgi Asparuhov Stadium; Attendance: 6,000; Referee: Thorsten Kinhofer (Germany)
