= 2009 UEFA European Under-21 Championship qualification Group 7 =

The teams competing in group 7 of the 2009 UEFA European Under-21 Championship qualifying competition are Austria, Belgium, Cyprus, Iceland, and Slovakia.

== Standings ==
Team	Pld	W	D	L	GF	GA	GD	Pts
Austria	8	6	2	0	12	6	+6	20
Slovakia	8	3	3	2	15	11	+4	12
Belgium	8	3	1	4	12	13	−1	10
Iceland	8	1	4	3	6	9	−3	7
Cyprus	8	2	0	6	9	15	−6	6

Key: Pts Points, Pld Matches played, W Won, D Drawn, L Lost, GF Goals for, GA Goals against, GD Goal Difference

== Matches ==
22 August 2007
18:00 CEST

Iceland	0 – 1	Cyprus
	Report	Demetriou 70'

Grindavíkurvöllur, Grindavík
Referee: Igorj Ishchenko (Ukraine)

7 September 2007
19:00 CEST

Slovakia	2 – 2	Iceland
Ižvolt 43' (pen.); Pilar 68'	Report	Vidarsson 50' (pen.); Bjarnason 77'

NTC Stadion, Senec
Referee: George Vadachkoria (Georgia)
7 September 2007
19:30 CEST

Belgium	0 – 1	Austria
	Report	Schiemer 74'

Achter de Kazerne, Mechelen
Referee: Bülent Yıldırım (Turkey)

11 September 2007
18:00 CEST

Slovakia	1 – 1	Austria
Maslo 84'	Report	Dober 63'

NTC Stadion, Senec
Referee: Aleksandar Stavrev (Macedonia)
11 September 2007
19:30 CEST

Iceland	0 – 0	Belgium
	Report

Akranesvöllur, Akranes
Referee: David McKeon (Republic of Ireland)

12 October 2007
18:00 CEST

Austria	2 – 1	Cyprus
Hohender 38'; Klein 45'	Report	Demetriou 74'

Sportzentrum Schwaz, Schwaz
Referee: Vlado Svilokos (Croatia)
12 October 2007
20:00 CEST

Belgium	4 – 2	Slovakia
De Mul 66'; Vanden Borre 74', 86'; Rossini 89'	Report	Opiela 21'; Jendrišek 55'

Stade Charles Tondreau, Mons
Referee: Vitaliy Godulyan (Ukraine)

16 October 2007
17:00 CEST

Iceland	1 – 1	Austria
Gislason 64'	Report	Dober 48'

Grindavíkurvöllur, Grindavík
Referee: Ferenc Bede (Hungary)
16 October 2007
17:30 CEST

Slovakia	4 – 1	Cyprus
Jurco 59', 82', 86' (pen.); Piroska 89'	Report	Aristidou 73'

NTC Senec, Senec
Referee: Siniša Zrnić (Bosnia and Herzegovina)

16 November 2007
13:30 CEST

Cyprus	1 – 2	Slovakia
Avraam 45+1'	Report	Pekarík 30'; Piroska 72'

Paralimni Stadium, Paralimni
Referee: Alexey Kulbakov (Belarus)
16 November 2007
18:00 CEST

Austria	3 – 2	Belgium
Erbek 32'; Madl 81'; Okotie 90'	Report	Legear 12'; Yulu-Matondo 52'

Waldstadion (Austria), Pasching
Referee: César Muñiz Fernández (Spain)

20 November 2007
13:30 CEST

Cyprus	1 – 2	Austria
Sielis 19'	Report	Hoffer 9'; Stankovic 56'

Dasaki Stadium, Achna
Referee: Augustus Viorel Constantin (Romania)
20 November 2007
20:00 CEST

Belgium	1 – 2	Iceland
De Mul 81'	Report	Bjarnason 15'; Smarason 25'

Edmond Machtens Stadium, Brussels
Referee: Audrius Zuta (Lithuania)

6 February 2008
14:00 CEST

Cyprus	2 – 0	Iceland
Panagi 54' (pen.); Sielis 56'	Report

Pafiako Stadium, Paphos
Referee: Stefano Podeschi (San Marino)

26 March 2008
17:30 CEST

Austria	1 – 0	Slovakia
Hoffer 7'	Report

Waldstadion, Pasching
Referee: Anthony Buttimer (Republic of Ireland)
26 March 2008
14:30 CEST

Cyprus	0 – 2	Belgium
	Report	Rossini 65'; De Mul 83'

Pafiako Stadium, Paphos
Referee: Ninoslav Spasić (Serbia)

5 September 2008
20:30 CEST

Austria	1 – 0	Iceland
Schiemer 7'	Report

Sportzentrum Schwaz, Schwaz
Referee: Babak Guliyev (Azerbaijan)
5 September 2008
18:00 CEST

Slovakia	3 – 0 (awarded)	Belgium
Weiss 65'	Report	Lamah 63'

NTC Stadion, Senec
Referee: Calum Murray (Scotland)
- Match originally ended 1–1. Later awarded as 3–0 forfeit win to Slovakia as Belgium fielded an ineligible player.

9 September 2008
19:00 CEST

Iceland	1 – 1	Slovakia
Sigurdsson 23'	Report	Stoch 42'

KR-völlur, Reykjavík
Referee: Albert Toussaint (Luxembourg)
9 September 2008
19:00 CEST

Belgium	3 – 2	Cyprus
Cordaro 59'; Rossini 78', 85'	Report	Avraam 16'; Vattis 54'

Stade Charles Tondreau, Mons
Referee: Lars Christoffersen (Denmark)

== Goalscorers ==
Pos	Player	Country	Goals
1	Giuseppe Rossini	Belgium	4
2	Tom De Mul	Belgium	3
2	Pavol Jurčo	Slovakia	3
4	Andreas Avraam	Cyprus	2
4	Birkir Bjarnason	Iceland	2
4	Michalis Demetriou	Cyprus	2
4	Andreas Dober	Austria	2
4	Erwin Hoffer	Austria	2
4	Juraj Piroska	Slovakia	2
4	Franz Schiemer	Austria	2
4	Georgios Sielis	Cyprus	2
4	Anthony Vanden Borre	Belgium	2

1 goal

- Austria: Harun Erbek, Niklas Hoheneder, Florian Klein, Michale Madl, Rubin Okotie, Marco Stankovic
- Belgium: Alessandro Cordaro, Roland Lamah, Jonathan Legear, Jeanvion Yulu-Matondo
- Cyprus: Menelaos Aristidou, Georgios Panagi, Elias Vattis
- Iceland: Rúrik Gíslason, Gylfi Sigurðsson, Arnar Smárason, Bjarni Viðarsson
- Slovakia: Matej Ižvolt, Erik Jendrišek, Ján Maslo, Lukás Opiela, Peter Pekarík, Pavol Pilar, Miroslav Stoch, Vladimír Weiss
