= Pavol =

- Gender: male

Origin
- Origin: Slavic
- Region of origin: Slovakia

Other names
- Related names: Paul, Pavel, Paweł, Pablo

Pavol is a masculine Slovak given name, equivalent to Paul.

== Notable people with the name ==
- Pavol Adami (1739–1795), Slovak scientist and scholar, one of the first veterinarians
- Pavol Bajza (born 1991), Slovak footballer
- Pavol Baláž (born 1984), Slovak footballer
- Pavol Barabáš (born 1959), Slovak film director
- Pavol Barmoš (born 1981), Slovak footballer
- Pavol Bencz (1936–2012), Slovak footballer
- Pavol Betin, Slovak volleyball player
- Pavol Biroš (1953–2020), Slovak footballer
- Pavol Blažek (born 1958), Slovak race walker
- Pavol Bojanovský (born 1953), Slovak basketball player
- Pavol Boriš (born 1954), Slovak winemaker and author
- Pavol Čarnogurský (1908—1992), Slovak politician
- Pavol Červenák (born 1987), Slovak tennis player
- Pavol Cicman (born 1985), Slovak footballer
- Pavol Demeš (born 1956), Slovak politician
- Pavol Demitra (1974–2011), Slovak ice hockey player
- Pavol Dindžík (born 1971), Slovak water polo player
- Pavol Diňa (born 1963), Slovak footballer
- Pavol Dobšinský (1828–1885), Slovak writer and collector of folklore
- Pavol Ďurica (born 1983), Slovak footballer
- Pavol Farkas (born 1985), Slovak footballer
- Pavol Frešo (born 1969), Slovak politician
- Pavol Peter Gojdič (1888–1960), Rusyn Basilian monk, bishop and martyr
- Pavol Gostič (born 1966), Slovak footballer
- Pavol Grman (born 1992), Slovak footballer
- Pavol Habera (born 1962), Slovak singer, musician, and actor
- Pavol Hammel (born 1948), Slovak musician and singer
- Pavol Hamžík (born 1954), Slovak politician
- Pavol Hell is a Canadian mathematician and computer scientist
- Pavol Hnilica (1921–2006), Slovak Roman Catholic bishop and Jesuit
- Pavol Hochschorner (born 1979), Slovak slalom canoeist
- Pavol Hric (born 1976), Slovak slalom canoeist
- Pavol Hrivnák (1931–1995), Slovak politician, former prime minister of Slovakia
- Pavol Hrušovský (born 1952), Slovak politician
- Pavol Hudák (born 1959), Slovak poet and journalist and publicist
- Pavol Hurajt (born 1978), Slovak biathlete
- Pavol Országh Hviezdoslav (1849–1921), Slovak poet, dramatist and translator
- Pavol Jablonický (born 1963), Slovak bodybuilder
- Pavol Jantausch (1870–1947), Slovak Roman Catholic bishop
- Pavol Jurčo (born 1986), Slovak footballer
- Pavol Kanis (born 1948), Slovak politician
- Pavol Kopačka (born 1974), Slovak footballer
- Pavol Kopp (born 1978), Slovak sport shooter
- Pavol Kosík (born 1980), Slovak footballer
- Pavol Lančarič (born 1963), Slovak manager
- Pavol Lisý (born 1995), Slovak go player
- Pavol Majerník (born 1978), Slovak football player and manager
- Pavol Masaryk (born 1980), Slovak footballer
- Pavol Maľa (1910–1970), Slovak athlete
- Pavol Michalík (born 1951), Slovak footballer
- Pavol Mihalik (born 1976), Slovak ice hockey player
- Pavol Minárik (1957–2018), Slovak politician.
- Pavol Molnár (born 1936), Slovak footballer
- Pavol Orolín (born 1987) Slovak footballer
- Pavol Pavlačič, Slovak Paralympic volleyball player
- Pavol Pavlis (born 1961), Slovak politician
- Pavol Pavlus (born 1974), Slovak footballer
- Pavol Paška, Slovak politician
- Pavol Penksa (born 1985), Slovak footballer
- Pavol Pilár (born 1986), Slovak footballer
- Pavol Pitoňák (born 1972), Slovak curler
- Pavol Polakovič (born 1974), Slovak boxer
- Pavol Poliaček (born 1988), Slovak footballer
- Pavol Polievka (born 1969), Slovak cyclist
- Pavol Poráč, Slovak ice dancer
- Pavol Pronaj (born 1982), Slovak footballer
- Pavol Rankov (born 1964), Slovak writer
- Pavol Regenda (born 1999), Slovak ice hockey player
- Pavol Rusko (born 1963), Slovak politician
- Pavol Rybár (born 1971), Slovak ice hockey player
- Pavol Jozef Šafárik (1795–1861), Slovak philologist, poet, historian and ethnographer
- Pavol Šafranko (born 1994), Slovak footballer
- Pavol Šajgalík (born 1955), Slovak physicist
- Pavol Šajgalík (bishop) (born 1964), Slovak Roman Catholic bishop
- Pavol Schmidt (1930–2001), Slovak rower
- Pavol Sedlák (born 1979), Slovak footballer
- Pavol Sedlák (volleyball), (born 1976/77), Slovak Paralympic volleyball player
- Pavol Skalický (born 1995), Slovak ice hockey player
- Pavol Socháň (1862–1941), Slovak photographer, ethnographer and writer
- Pavol Šoral (born 1903), Slovak footballer
- Pavol Staňo (born 1977), Slovak footballer
- Pavol Steiner (1908–1969), Slovak water polo player and cardiac surgeon
- Pavol Straka (born 1980), Slovak footballer
- Pavol Strapáč (1957–2021), Slovak footballer
- Pavol Šuhaj (born 1981), Slovak footballer
- Pavol Svitana (born 1948), Slovak ice hockey player
- Pavol Szikora (1952–2021), Slovak race walker
- Pavol Zelenay (1928–2024), Slovak swing musician

== See also ==
- Paul
- Pavol Jozef Šafárik University, university located in Košice, Slovakia
