= Pablo Soto =

Pablo Soto may refer to:

- Pablo Soto (software developer) (born 1979), Spanish software developer and local councilor
- Pablo Soto (footballer) (born 1995), Chilean football goalkeeper
- Pablo Soto Solís (born 1995), Chilean football forward for Deportes Puerto Montt
