= Kalin Shtarkov =

Bulgarian footballer

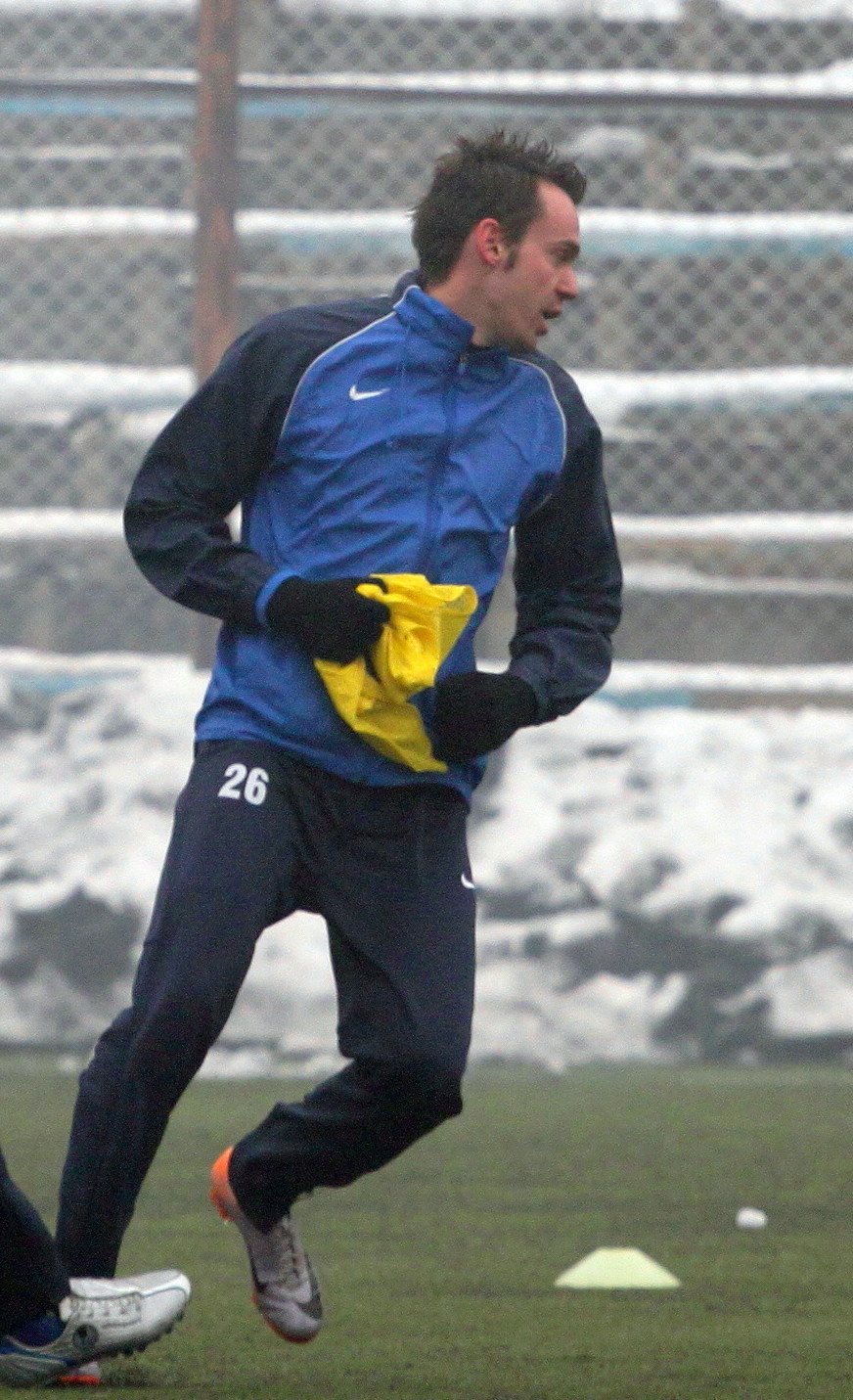

Personal information
- Full name: Kalin Emilov Shtarkov
- Date of birth: 20 May 1984 (age 42)
- Place of birth: Bulgaria
- Height: 1.82 m (5 ft 11 1/2 in)
- Position: Left back

Team information
- Current team: Conegliano German

Youth career
- 1996–2002: Levski Sofia

Senior career*
Years	Team	Apps	(Gls)
2002–2004	Levski Sofia	0	(0)
2003–2004	→ Levski Dolna Banya (loan)	23	(9)
2004–2006	Rodopa Smolyan	36	(9)
2006–2008	Rilski Sportist	55	(2)
2008–2010	Chavdar Etropole	58	(1)
2010–2011	Levski Sofia	1	(0)
2011	→ Vidima-Rakovski (loan)	13	(1)
2011–2012	Vidima-Rakovski	28	(1)
2013–	Conegliano German		
- * Club domestic league appearances and goals

Kalin Shtarkov (Bulgarian: Калин Щърков; born on 20 May 1984) is a Bulgarian footballer who currently plays as a defender for Conegliano German.

== Career ==
After his youth career in Levski Sofia's youth academy, Kalin was loaned to Levski's satellite team Levski Dolna Banya. After two years there, Shturkov spent several years in Rodopa Smolyan, Rilski Sportist Samokov and FC Chavdar Etropole. With PFC Chavdar, Shatkov achieved 1/2 final for Bulgarian Cup in 2010. After a great 2009/2010 season, Kalin became a free-agent.

=== Levski Sofia ===
After 8 years, careering in second division teams, Kalin finally returned Levski. Shtarkov signed for the first team on 25 May 2010 as a free-agent. On 30 June 2010, Kalin made his unofficial debut for Levski in a match against FCM Târgu Mureş, entering the match as a substitute. Kalin made his official debut for Levski against PFC Kaliakra Kavarna on 22 August 2010 in a 3–0 home win.

Levski qualified for Europa League group stage. Levski was drawn in Group C, facing Gent, Lille and Sporting CP. The first match was against Gent. Levski won the match in a 3–2 home win. The winning goal was scored by Serginho Greene. With this win Levski recorded 8 games in-a-row without losing in European competitions. After that Levski lost catastrophically from Sporting CP with 5–0. Followed by another loss against Lille. In Sofia Levski played very well against Lille and was leading 2-1 until Ivo Ivanov scored an own goal to make it 2–2. In the last match of the Group C, Levski take a win against Sporting CP with 1–0, the winning goal was scored by Daniel Mladenov. In this match Kalin made his official European debut. He made a great match, defending perfectly the left side of the field.

=== Vidima-Rakovski ===
On 29 January 2011, it was decided that Kalin will spend a six-month loan period at PFC Vidima-Rakovski Sevlievo.
