= Paval =

Paval or Pavăl may refer to:

== People ==
- Paval Navara (1927–1983), Belarusian émigré public figure and co-founder of the Anglo-Belarusian Society
- Paval Sieviaryniec (born 1976), Belarusian journalist and politician
- Paval Zhauryd (1889–1939), Belarusian military commander
- Ana Maria Pavăl (born 1983), Romanian freestyle wrestler
- Costin Pavăl (born 1990), Romanian tennis player
- Philip Kran Paval (1899–1971), Danish painter born Philip Krenker Petersen

== Other uses ==
- Paval, Iran, a village

== See also ==
- Pavel
