= Garra Dembélé =

French-born Malian footballer (born 1986)

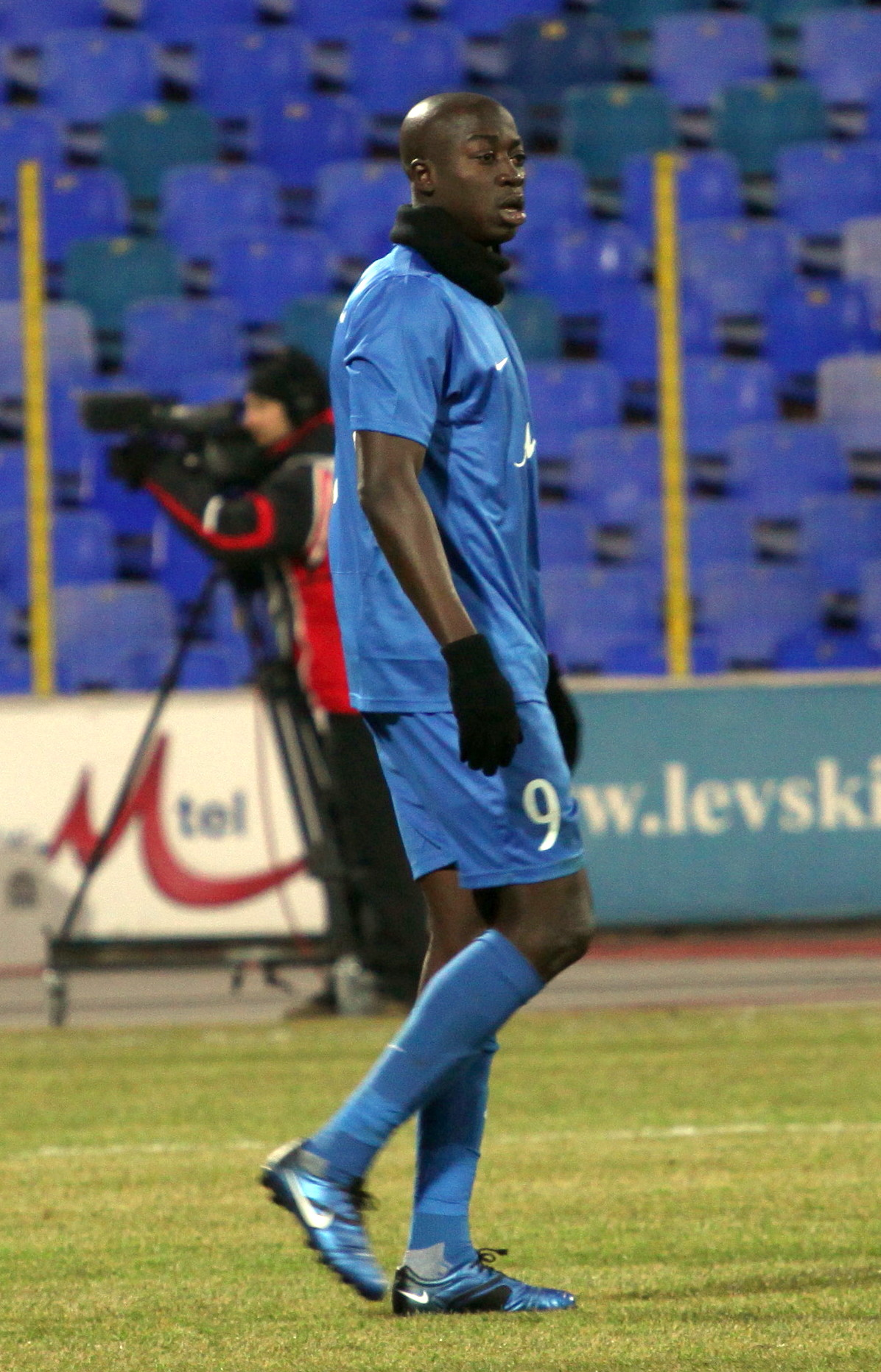
- Dembélé with Levski Sofia

Personal information
- Full name: Garra Dembélé
- Date of birth: 21 February 1986 (age 40)
- Place of birth: Gennevilliers, France
- Height: 1.87 m (6 ft 2 in)
- Position: Forward

Youth career
- 1995–1999: CSM Puteaux
- 1999–2002: INF Clairefontaine
- 2002–2006: Auxerre

Senior career*
Years	Team	Apps	(Gls)
2004–2006	Auxerre B	40	(13)
2007	Istres	12	(3)
2007–2008	AGF	3	(0)
2008–2009	Pierikos	32	(6)
2010	Lokomotiv Plovdiv	14	(5)
2010–2011	Levski Sofia	25	(26)
2011–2013	SC Freiburg	19	(1)
2013	→ Wuhan Zall (loan)	20	(3)
2014–2016	Dubai CSC	0	(0)
2016–2017	Solothurn	17	(6)
Total		182	(63)

International career
2003–2004	France U18	?	(1)
2004	France U19	2	(1)
2011–2012	Mali	7	(1)
- * Club domestic league appearances and goals

Garra Dembélé (born 21 February 1986) is a former professional footballer who played as a forward. Born in France, he represented Mali at international level.

== Club career ==
=== Early career ===
Born in Gennevilliers, Dembélé began his career in INF Clairefontaine, before being transferred to Auxerre. On 1 June 2006, he was released from the club for disciplinary reasons. In January 2007, he joined Istres. After six months there, Dembélé moved to AGF Århus. In July 2008, he signed with Pierikos in Greece.

=== Lokomotiv Plovdiv ===
After a year and a half, in which he played 32 games and scored six goals, Dembélé left Pierikos to sign with Bulgarian club Lokomotiv Plovdiv in January 2010. He appeared in 14 games for the Smurfs and scored five goals.

=== Levski Sofia ===
On 5 June 2010, it was announced that Dembélé had signed for Levski Sofia. On 9 June 2010, Dembélé was officially presented as a Levski Sofia player. The transfer fee was around €200,000 on a three-year contract. He made his unofficial debut against Metalist Kharkiv on 1 July 2010 and scored in a 3–2 win.

His official debut for Levski was in a match against Dundalk, in the second qualifying round for Europa League. Levski had won the first match 6–0, with Dembélé scoring once. In the return match Levski won 0–2, with Dembele scoring both goals. In the first round of the A PFG Dembélé scored the winning goal for Levski in the Eternal Derby against CSKA Sofia.

He scored a further two goals in the next Europa League qualification round against Swedish Kalmar FF. The play-off against AIK Fotboll saw Dembélé scoring another decisive goal for his new club, ensuring Levski's qualification to the Group stages of the Europa League. They were drawn in Group C alongside Gent, Lille and Sporting CP. With his six goals in six games Dembélé was the leading goalscorer in the Europa League qualification matches. On 9 August 2010, Dembélé scored his first hat-trick for Levski against Lokomotiv Sofia. The result of the match was 3–1 with a home win for Levski Sofia. He further added to his tally in the competition by scoring in the 3–2 home win against Gent in UEFA Europa League, scoring his seventh goal in the competition. With this win Levski recorded an eight-match unbeaten run in European competitions, a run which was ended after Levski suffered a heavy 5–0 defeat against Sporting CP, followed by another loss against Lille. In Sofia, Levski played very well against Lille, with Dembélé scoring the opening goal in the match. The Blues were leading 2–1 until Ivo Ivanov scored an own goal to make it 2–2. In the last match of Group C, already eliminated Levski won against Sporting CP 1–0 - the winning goal was scored by Daniel Mladenov, who was assisted by Dembélé.

However, Dembélé continued his goal-scoring spree in the Bulgarian A Professional Football Group. By 17 September 2010 he had already scored two hat-tricks in the competition against Lokomotiv Sofia and Minyor Pernik respectively. He also scored the winning penalties in the victories against Vidima-Rakovski and Cherno More. He continued his good games after scoring the first goal against Beroe in a 2–1 win for Levski.

He scored his third hat-trick in the A PFG against Pirin Blagoevgrad in Levski's 4–1 win at Georgi Asparuhov, helping his team come back from being 1–0 down. After this, he scored a goal against Litex Lovech, but Levski lost the game by a score of 1–2 and suffered a run of three straight defeats. In February 2011, during the preparation for the second part of the season, it was announced that Dembélé would wear the number nine jersey, following his decision to stay during the 2010–11 winter transfer window.

He was rated among the most efficient attacking players of the 2010–11 season in Europe, with a goal at every 76.89 minutes.

Dembélé expressed his satisfaction with the way he was received by Levski supporters, but was less magnanimous in his assessments regarding the quality of the training sessions during his time in Bulgaria.

=== SC Freiburg ===
On 3 June 2011, it was officially announced that Dembélé had been bought by SC Freiburg for 2.5 million euros. It was the first time in the club's history that it paid over two million Euro for a transfer, making it the largest transfer fee Freiburg had ever paid. On 28 June 2011, Dembélé made his unofficial debut for the team and netted a goal in the 4–1 win over TSG Balingen in a friendly match. On 6 August 2011, he made his first official appearance, coming on as a late substitute in the 2–2 away draw with FC Augsburg in a Bundesliga match. Dembélé's first Bundesliga start came on 28 October 2011, in the 0–1 home loss against Bayer Leverkusen. After making nine appearances for the club without a goal, Dembélé netted for the first time in the Bundesliga on 26 November 2011, scoring a last-minute goal to secure a 1–1 away draw with TSG 1899 Hoffenheim.

=== Wuhan Zall (loan) ===
In February 2013, after finding it difficult to secure a starting spot with the German side, Dembélé was loaned out to Chinese Super League club Wuhan Zall until the end of the year. He made his official debut on 16 March 2013, playing the full 90 minutes in the 0–1 home loss against Beijing Guoan. Dembélé netted his first goal on 27 April, opening the scoring in the 2–3 away defeat against Tianjin Teda. On 3 August 2013, he was sent off for the first time in the 0–3 away loss against Dalian Aerbin.

=== Dubai CSC ===
He was between 2014 and 2016 on the books of the Dubai CSC team in the United Arab Emirates, but due to a mix-up was not registered to play for the team.

=== Solothurn ===
In July 2016, Dembélé joined Swiss club Solothurn, where he played for one full season.

== International career ==
He was part of the France under-18 team from 2003 to 2004. Dembélé was eligible to represent either France or Mali at senior international level, but in November 2010, he chose to play for Mali. Dembélé earned his first call-up to the national side of Mali, the country of his parents, for the friendly match against Congo DR, but did not feature in the game. On 8 February 2011, he finally made his debut for Mali, playing the first 45 minutes of the 0–1 loss against Ivory Coast in a friendly match. Dembélé earned his second cap for Mali in the 1:1 draw with Burkina Faso on 11 November 2011. In January 2012, he was included in the Mali squad for the 2012 African Cup of Nations. On 24 January 2012, Dembélé made his first appearance in an official tournament for Mali, entering the fray as a 64th minute replacement for Cheick Diabaté in the 1–0 win over Guinea. A week later, he scored his first goal for the team during the same tournament, against Botswana. Mali eventually finished in third place, with Dembélé participating in five of their six matches.

== Personal life ==
While playing in Auxerre he had been convicted of driving while intoxicated resulting in suspension of his driving licence. Later he was again punished for driving without a license.

In October 2006, he was accused of rape by a 22-year-old American student while in Rome, but was later released and allowed to return to France.

On 2 December 2010, he was arrested in Sofia for drunk driving and producing a fake driving license. On 2 February 2011, Dembélé was handed an eight-month suspended sentence for drink-driving offence. He was handed the suspended sentence with a three-year probation period after being caught drink-driving in December and presenting police with a forged driving licence.

== Career statistics ==
=== Club ===
Appearances and goals by club, season and competition
Club	Season	League			Cup		Europe		Total	
Club	Season	Division	Apps	Goals	Apps	Goals	Apps	Goals	Apps	Goals
Auxerre B	2003–04	CFA	2	0	—		—		2	0
Auxerre B	2004–05	CFA	18	8	—		—		18	8
Auxerre B	2005–06	CFA	20	5	—		—		20	5
Auxerre B	Total		40	13	—		—		40	13
Istres	2006–07	Ligue 2	12	3	0	0	—		12	3
AGF	2007–08	Danish Superliga	3	0	0	0	—		3	0
Pierikos	2008–09	Beta Ethniki	23	4	1	0	—		24	4
Pierikos	2009–10	Beta Ethniki	9	2	2	0	—		11	2
Pierikos	Total		32	6	3	0	—		35	6
Lokomotiv Plovdiv	2009–10	A Group	14	5	0	0	—		14	5
Levski Sofia	2010–11	A Group	24	26	3	2	12	8	39	36
SC Freiburg	2011–12	Bundesliga	16	1	1	0	—		17	1
SC Freiburg	2012–13	Bundesliga	3	0	0	0	—		3	0
SC Freiburg	Total		19	1	1	0	—		20	1
SC Freiburg II	2011–12	Regionalliga Süd	1	1	—		—		1	1
Wuhan Zall	2013	Chinese Super League	20	3	1	0	—		21	3
FC Solothurn	2016–17	Swiss 1. Liga	17	6	0	0	—		17	6
Career total			182	64	8	2	12	8	202	74

=== International goals ===
Scores and results list Mali's goal tally first, score column indicates score after each Dembélé goal.

List of international goals scored by Garra Dembélé
No.	Date	Venue	Opponent	Score	Result	Competition	Ref.
1	1 February 2012	Stade d'Angondjé, Libreville, Gabon	Botswana	1–1	2–1	2012 African Cup of Nations	

== Honours ==
Mali

- Africa Cup of Nations bronze: 2012
