= Pavol Pronaj =

Slovak footballer

Personal information
- Full name: Pavol Pronaj
- Date of birth: 30 May 1982 (age 44)
- Place of birth: Martin, Czechoslovakia
- Height: 1.93 m (6 ft 4 in)
- Position: Goalkeeper

Senior career*
Years	Team	Apps	(Gls)
–2001	ZTS Martin		
2001–2003	FO ZP Sport Podbrezova		
2004–2006	Dynamo České Budějovice	12	(0)
2006–2007	Odra Opole	15	(0)
2007	Fotbal Třinec		
2007	Motor Lublin	1	(0)
2008	ŁKS Łomża	14	(0)
2008	Znicz Pruszków	3	(0)
2009–2010	Turany		
2011–2017	Martin		
2015	→ Nová Baňa (loan)		
2016	→ Turany (loan)		
2017–2018	Družstevník Vasiľov		
2018–2019	Slávia Staškov		
- * Club domestic league appearances and goals

Pavol Pronaj (born 30 May 1982) is a Slovak former professional footballer who played as a goalkeeper.
