= Pablo Lopez =

Pablo Lopez or López may refer to:

== Arts and entertainment ==
- Pablo López Luz (born 1979), Mexican photographer
- Pablo López (singer), Spanish singer

== Politics and government ==
- Pablo Alejo López Núñez (born 1967), Mexican politician from Baja California
- Pablo Sebastián López (born 1975), Argentine political activist

== Sports ==
- Pablo López (baseball) (born 1996), Venezuelan baseball player
- Pablo López (footballer, born 1977), Spanish football manager for Ourense, and former centre-back
- Pablo López (footballer, born 1982), Argentine football midfielder
- Pablo López (footballer, born 1996), Uruguayan football midfielder for Deportes La Serena
- Pablo López (footballer, born 1998), Mexican football midfielder for Jaguares
- Pablo López (footballer, born 2006), Spanish football winger for Valencia Mestalla

== Fictional characters ==
- Pablo Lopez, character in Mi calle
- Pablo Lopez, character in La casa de al lado
