= MŠK Turany =

Slovak football club

- Full name: MŠK Turany
- Founded: 1933
- Ground: Mestský štadión Turany, Turany
- Capacity: 1,200
- Chairman: Viliam Kapusta
- League: 1. trieda (6th division)

MŠK Turany is a Slovak football team, based in the town of Turany. The club was founded in 1933. It currently plays in 1. trieda (6th tier in the Slovak football league system).
