= Pablo Iglesias =

Pablo Iglesias may refer to:

- Pablo Iglesias Posse (1850–1925), Spanish socialist politician and labour leader, founder of the PSOE and UGT
- Pablo Iglesias Simón (1977–), Spanish theatre director, playwright, researcher, sound designer, and professor
- Pablo Iglesias Turrión (1978–), Spanish politician; former secretary-general of Podemos (2014–2021), and second deputy prime minister of Spain (2020–2021)
