= Elias Vattis =

Cypriot footballer (born 1986)

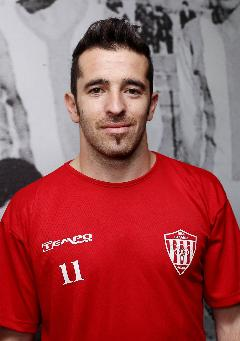

Personal information
- Date of birth: February 28, 1986 (age 40)
- Place of birth: Limassol, Cyprus
- Height: 1.74 m (5 ft 9 in)
- Position: Attacking midfielder

Team information
- Current team: Karmiotissa
- Number: 7

Youth career
- AEL Limassol

Senior career*
Years	Team	Apps	(Gls)
2003–2007	AEL Limassol	25	(1)
2007–2008	AC Omonia	10	(1)
2008–2009	Alki Larnaca	12	(1)
2009–2010	ASIL Lysi	23	(4)
2010–2013	Ethnikos Achna	58	(7)
2013–2014	Nea Salamina	35	(6)
2014–2015	Enosis Neon Paralimni	21	(8)
2015–2016	Kissamikos	25	(5)
2016–	Karmiotissa	77	(16)

International career^{‡}
2007	Cyprus	2	(0)
- * Club domestic league appearances and goals as of 13:30, 21 May 2020 (UTC) ‡ National team caps and goals as of September 1, 2008

Elias Vattis (born February 28, 1986, in Cyprus) is a Cypriot midfielder who plays for Karmiotissa. He started his career in AEL Limassol.

== Nea Salamina ==
On July 3, 2013, Vattis got transferred to Nea Salamis Famagusta FC.
