= 2010–11 UEFA Europa League group stage =

International football competition

This article details the 2010–11 UEFA Europa League group stage.

The group stage featured 48 teams: the title holders, Atlético Madrid, the 37 winners of the play-off round, and the 10 losing teams from the Champions League play-off round

The teams were drawn into twelve groups of four, and played each other home-and-away in a round-robin format. The matchdays were 16 September, 30 September, 21 October, 4 November, 1–2 December, and 15–16 December 2010.

The top two teams in each group advanced to the round of 32, where they were joined by the eight third-placed teams from the 2010–11 UEFA Champions League group stage.

== Teams ==
The draw for the group stage was held in Monaco on 27 August 2010 at 1:00pm CEST (UTC+2).

Teams were seeded into four pots based on their 2010 UEFA club coefficients. The title holders, Atlético Madrid, were automatically seeded into Pot 1. Teams from the same national association could not be drawn against each other. Pot 1 held teams ranked 4–39, Pot 2 held teams ranked 40–69, Pot 3 held teams ranked 74–127, while Pot 4 held teams ranked 130–217 and unranked teams.

Group winners and runners-up advanced to the round of 32

Pot 1
Team	Notes	Coeff.
(Spain) Atlético Madrid		63.951
(England) Liverpool		115.371
(Spain) Sevilla		108.951
(Portugal) Porto		76.659
(Spain) Villarreal		70.951
(Russia) CSKA Moscow		66.758
(Netherlands) PSV Eindhoven		66.309
(Russia) Zenit Saint Petersburg		61.258
(Italy) Juventus		59.867
(Portugal) Sporting CP		57.659
(Germany) VfB Stuttgart		52.841
(Netherlands) AZ		48.309

Pot 2
Team	Notes	Coeff.
(Romania) Steaua București		47.898
(France) Lille		46.748
(Ukraine) Dynamo Kyiv		42.910
(Belgium) Anderlecht		42.580
(Germany) Bayer Leverkusen		40.841
(France) Paris Saint-Germain		39.748
(Belgium) Club Brugge		36.580
(Italy) Palermo		35.867
(Spain) Getafe		33.951
(Turkey) Beşiktaş		33.890
(England) Manchester City		33.371
(Italy) Sampdoria		30.867

Pot 3
Team	Notes	Coeff.
(Czech Republic) Sparta Prague		27.395
(Greece) AEK Athens		25.979
(Ukraine) Metalist Kharkiv		25.410
(Bulgaria) Levski Sofia		25.400
(Norway) Rosenborg		23.980
(Austria) Red Bull Salzburg		19.915
(Bulgaria) CSKA Sofia		15.400
(Denmark) Odense		14.970
(Italy) Napoli		14.867
(Germany) Borussia Dortmund		14.841
(Croatia) Dinamo Zagreb		14.466
(Belarus) BATE Borisov		13.308

Pot 4
Team	Notes	Coeff.
(Greece) Aris		12.979
(Austria) Rapid Wien		11.915
(Greece) PAOK		11.479
(Poland) Lech Poznań		11.008
(Ukraine) Karpaty Lviv		7.910
(Switzerland) Young Boys		7.675
(Netherlands) Utrecht		7.309
(Belgium) Gent		6.580
(Switzerland) Lausanne-Sport		5.675
(Moldova) Sheriff Tiraspol		5.458
(Hungary) Debrecen		5.350
(Croatia) Hajduk Split		3.466

Notes

1. ^{TH} Europa League title holders (automatic top seed of pot 1)
2. ^{CL-CP} Losing teams from the Champions League play-off round (Champions Path)
3. ^{CP} Losing teams from the Champions League play-off round (Non-Champions Path)

On the first four matchdays, when matches were played only on Thursdays, six groups played their matches at 19:00 CET/CEST, while the other six groups played their matches at 21:05 CET/CEST, with the two sets of groups (A–F, G–L) alternating between each matchday. On the final two matchdays, when matches were played on both Wednesdays and Thursdays, the two sets of groups were divided into four smaller subsets (A–C, D–F, G–I, J–L), with each subset of groups playing on a different day and time. Based on this principle, the draw was controlled for clubs from the same association in order to split the teams evenly. For example, if there were two teams from the same association, each team was drawn into a different set of groups (A–F, G–L); if there were four teams from the same association, each team was drawn into a different subset of groups (A–C, D–F, G–I, J–L).

The fixtures were decided after the draw. There were certain restrictions, e.g., teams from the same city do not play at home on the same matchday (UEFA tries to avoid teams from the same city play at home on the same day or on consecutive days), and Russian teams do not play at home on the last matchday due to cold weather.

== Tie-breaking criteria ==
If two or more teams were equal on points on completion of the group matches, the following criteria applied to determine the rankings:

1. higher number of points obtained in the group matches played among the teams in question;
2. superior goal difference from the group matches played among the teams in question;
3. higher number of goals scored away from home in the group matches played among the teams in question;
4. superior goal difference from all group matches played;
5. higher number of goals scored;
6. higher number of coefficient points accumulated by the club in question, as well as its association, over the previous five seasons.

== Groups ==
Times up to end of October are CEST (UTC+2), thereafter times are CET (UTC+1)

=== Group A ===
Pos	Team	Pld	W	D	L	GF	GA	GD	Pts	Qualification	MC	LEC	JUV	SAL
1	(England) Manchester City	6	3	2	1	11	6	+5	11	Advance to knockout phase	—	3–1	1–1	3–0
2	(Poland) Lech Poznań	6	3	2	1	11	8	+3	11	Advance to knockout phase	3–1	—	1–1	2–0
3	(Italy) Juventus	6	0	6	0	7	7	0	6		1–1	3–3	—	0–0
4	(Austria) Red Bull Salzburg	6	0	2	4	1	9	−8	2		0–2	0–1	1–1	—

Source: Soccerway
16 September 2010
19:00

Red Bull Salzburg (Austria)	0–2	(England) Manchester City
	Report	Silva 8'; Jô 63'

Red Bull Arena, Wals-Siezenheim
Attendance: 25,150
Referee: Georgios Daloukas (Greece)
16 September 2010
19:00

Juventus (Italy)	3–3	(Poland) Lech Poznań
Chiellini 45+2', 50'; Del Piero 68'	Report	Rudņevs 14' (pen.), 30', 90+2'

Stadio Olimpico, Turin
Attendance: 10,837
Referee: Vladislav Bezborodov (Russia)

30 September 2010
21:05

Lech Poznań (Poland)	2–0	(Austria) Red Bull Salzburg
Arboleda 47'; Peszko 80'	Report

Stadion Miejski, Poznań
Attendance: 42,000
Referee: Kristinn Jakobsson (Iceland)
30 September 2010
21:05

Manchester City (England)	1–1	(Italy) Juventus
A. Johnson 37'	Report	Iaquinta 10'

City of Manchester Stadium, Manchester
Attendance: 35,212
Referee: Eduardo Iturralde González (Spain)

21 October 2010
21:05

Manchester City (England)	3–1	(Poland) Lech Poznań
Adebayor 13', 25', 73'	Report	Tshibamba 50'

City of Manchester Stadium, Manchester
Attendance: 33,388
Referee: Alexandru Dan Tudor (Romania)
21 October 2010
21:05

Red Bull Salzburg (Austria)	1–1	(Italy) Juventus
Švento 36'	Report	Krasić 47'

Red Bull Arena, Wals-Siezenheim
Attendance: 19,200
Referee: Zsolt Szabó (Hungary)

4 November 2010
19:00

Lech Poznań (Poland)	3–1	(England) Manchester City
Injac 31'; Arboleda 86'; Możdżeń 90+1'	Report	Adebayor 51'

Stadion Miejski, Poznań
Attendance: 42,590
Referee: Pieter Vink (Netherlands)
4 November 2010
19:00

Juventus (Italy)	0–0	(Austria) Red Bull Salzburg
	Report

Stadio Olimpico, Turin
Attendance: 12,162
Referee: Daniel Stalhammar (Sweden)

1 December 2010
21:05

Manchester City (England)	3–0	(Austria) Red Bull Salzburg
Balotelli 18', 65'; A. Johnson 78'	Report

City of Manchester Stadium, Manchester
Attendance: 37,552
Referee: Libor Kovařík (Czech Republic)
1 December 2010
21:05

Lech Poznań (Poland)	1–1	(Italy) Juventus
Rudņevs 12'	Report	Iaquinta 84'

Stadion Miejski, Poznań
Attendance: 42,590
Referee: Fernando Teixeira Vitienes (Spain)

16 December 2010
19:00

Red Bull Salzburg (Austria)	0–1	(Poland) Lech Poznań
	Report	Štilić 30'

Red Bull Arena, Wals-Siezenheim
Attendance: 5,300
Referee: Maksim Layushkin (Russia)
16 December 2010
19:00

Juventus (Italy)	1–1	(England) Manchester City
Giannetti 43'	Report	Jô 77'

Stadio Olimpico, Turin
Attendance: 6,992
Referee: István Vad (Hungary)

=== Group B ===
Pos	Team	Pld	W	D	L	GF	GA	GD	Pts	Qualification	LEV	ARI	ATL	RBK
1	(Germany) Bayer Leverkusen	6	3	3	0	8	2	+6	12	Advance to knockout phase	—	1–0	1–1	4–0
2	(Greece) Aris	6	3	1	2	7	5	+2	10	Advance to knockout phase	0–0	—	1–0	2–0
3	(Spain) Atlético Madrid	6	2	2	2	9	7	+2	8		1–1	2–3	—	3–0
4	(Norway) Rosenborg	6	1	0	5	3	13	−10	3		0–1	2–1	1–2	—

Source: Soccerway
16 September 2010
19:00

Aris (Greece)	1–0	(Spain) Atlético Madrid
Javito 59'	Report

Kleanthis Vikelidis Stadium, Thessaloniki
Attendance: 16,699
Referee: Mark Clattenburg (England)
16 September 2010
19:00

Bayer Leverkusen (Germany)	4–0	(Norway) Rosenborg
Helmes 4', 58', 61'; Reinartz 38'	Report

BayArena, Leverkusen
Attendance: 13,065
Referee: Nicolai Vollquartz (Denmark)

30 September 2010
21:05

Rosenborg (Norway)	2–1	(Greece) Aris
Moldskred 37'; Prica 68'	Report	Ruiz 43'

Lerkendal Stadion, Trondheim
Attendance: 11,016
Referee: Eric Braamhaar (Netherlands)
30 September 2010
21:05

Atlético Madrid (Spain)	1–1	(Germany) Bayer Leverkusen
Simão 51' (pen.)	Report	Derdiyok 39'

Vicente Calderón, Madrid
Attendance: 28,502
Referee: Paolo Tagliavento (Italy)

21 October 2010
21:05

Atlético Madrid (Spain)	3–0	(Norway) Rosenborg
Godín 17'; Agüero 66'; Costa 78'	Report

Vicente Calderón, Madrid
Attendance: 28,472
Referee: Cyril Zimmermann (Switzerland)
21 October 2010
21:05

Aris (Greece)	0–0	(Germany) Bayer Leverkusen
	Report

Kleanthis Vikelidis Stadium, Thessaloniki
Attendance: 16,372
Referee: Martin Ingvarsson (Sweden)

4 November 2010
19:00

Rosenborg (Norway)	1–2	(Spain) Atlético Madrid
Henriksen 52'	Report	Agüero 4'; Tiago 84'

Lerkendal Stadion, Trondheim
Attendance: 14,248
Referee: Vladislav Bezborodov (Russia)
4 November 2010
19:00

Bayer Leverkusen (Germany)	1–0	(Greece) Aris
Vidal 90'	Report

BayArena, Leverkusen
Attendance: 18,265
Referee: Bruno Paixão (Portugal)

1 December 2010
21:05

Atlético Madrid (Spain)	2–3	(Greece) Aris
Forlán 11'; Agüero 16'	Report	Koke 2', 51' (pen.); Lazaridis 81'

Vicente Calderón, Madrid
Attendance: 21,154
Referee: Ivan Bebek (Croatia)
1 December 2010
21:05

Rosenborg (Norway)	0–1	(Germany) Bayer Leverkusen
	Report	Sam 35'

Lerkendal Stadion, Trondheim
Attendance: 11,096
Referee: Alan Kelly (Republic of Ireland)

16 December 2010
19:00

Aris (Greece)	2–0	(Norway) Rosenborg
Cesarec 45+1'; Faty 90+2'	Report

Kleanthis Vikelidis Stadium, Thessaloniki
Attendance: 17,283
Referee: Thomas Einwaller (Austria)
16 December 2010
19:00

Bayer Leverkusen (Germany)	1–1	(Spain) Atlético Madrid
Helmes 69'	Report	Mérida 72'

BayArena, Leverkusen
Attendance: 18,903
Referee: Alexandru Dan Tudor (Romania)

=== Group C ===
Pos	Team	Pld	W	D	L	GF	GA	GD	Pts	Qualification	SCP	LIL	GNT	LS
1	(Portugal) Sporting CP	6	4	0	2	14	6	+8	12	Advance to knockout phase	—	1–0	5–1	5–0
2	(France) Lille	6	2	2	2	8	6	+2	8	Advance to knockout phase	1–2	—	3–0	1–0
3	(Belgium) Gent	6	2	1	3	8	13	−5	7		3–1	1–1	—	1–0
4	(Bulgaria) Levski Sofia	6	2	1	3	6	11	−5	7		1–0	2–2	3–2	—

Source: Soccerway
16 September 2010
19:00

Lille (France)	1–2	(Portugal) Sporting CP
Frau 57'	Report	Vukčević 11'; Postiga 34'

Stadium Lille Métropole, Villeneuve-d'Ascq
Attendance: 14,457
Referee: Martin Atkinson (England)
16 September 2010
19:00

Levski Sofia (Bulgaria)	3–2	(Belgium) Gent
Joãozinho 42'; Dembélé 60'; Greene 84'	Report	Azofeifa 23'; Šuler 48'

Georgi Asparuhov Stadium, Sofia
Attendance: 22,240
Referee: Zsolt Szabó (Hungary)

30 September 2010
21:05

Gent (Belgium)	1–1	(France) Lille
De Smet 5'	Report	Frau 21'

Jules Ottenstadion, Ghent
Attendance: 7,834
Referee: Alexandru Dan Tudor (Romania)
30 September 2010
21:05

Sporting CP (Portugal)	5–0	(Bulgaria) Levski Sofia
Carriço 30'; Maniche 43'; Salomão 53'; Postiga 61'; Fernández 79'	Report

Estádio José Alvalade, Lisbon
Attendance: 15,081
Referee: Sascha Kever (Switzerland)

21 October 2010
21:05

Sporting CP (Portugal)	5–1	(Belgium) Gent
Salomão 7'; Liédson 13', 27'; Maniche 37'; Postiga 59'	Report	Wils 16'

Estádio José Alvalade, Lisbon
Attendance: 15,008
Referee: Alan Kelly (Republic of Ireland)
21 October 2010
21:05

Lille (France)	1–0	(Bulgaria) Levski Sofia
Chedjou 49'	Report

Stadium Lille Métropole, Villeneuve-d'Ascq
Attendance: 14,646
Referee: Kristinn Jakobsson (Iceland)

4 November 2010
19:00

Gent (Belgium)	3–1	(Portugal) Sporting CP
Smolders 7' (pen.); Conté 79'; Arbeitman 82'	Report	Saleiro 38'

Jules Ottenstadion, Ghent
Attendance: 8,795
Referee: Peter Rasmussen (Denmark)
4 November 2010
19:00

Levski Sofia (Bulgaria)	2–2	(France) Lille
Dembélé 11'; Gadzhev 82'	Report	Melo 35'; Ivanov 88' (o.g.)

Georgi Asparuhov Stadium, Sofia
Attendance: 17,440
Referee: Milorad Mažić (Serbia)

1 December 2010
21:05

Sporting CP (Portugal)	1–0	(France) Lille
Polga 28'	Report

Estádio José Alvalade, Lisbon
Attendance: 16,569
Referee: Bas Nijhuis (Netherlands)
1 December 2010
21:05

Gent (Belgium)	1–0	(Bulgaria) Levski Sofia
Wallace 77'	Report

Jules Ottenstadion, Ghent
Attendance: 8,662
Referee: Tommy Skjerven (Norway)

16 December 2010
19:00

Lille (France)	3–0	(Belgium) Gent
Obraniak 30'; Frau 56'; Sow 89'	Report

Stadium Lille Métropole, Villeneuve-d'Ascq
Attendance: 15,285
Referee: Carlos Clos Gómez (Spain)
16 December 2010
19:00

Levski Sofia (Bulgaria)	1–0	(Portugal) Sporting CP
Mladenov 45'	Report

Georgi Asparuhov Stadium, Sofia
Attendance: 5,000
Referee: Thorsten Kinhöfer (Germany)

=== Group D ===
Pos	Team	Pld	W	D	L	GF	GA	GD	Pts	Qualification	VLR	PAOK	DZ	BRG
1	(Spain) Villarreal	6	4	0	2	8	5	+3	12	Advance to knockout phase	—	1–0	3–0	2–1
2	(Greece) PAOK	6	3	2	1	5	3	+2	11	Advance to knockout phase	1–0	—	1–0	1–1
3	(Croatia) Dinamo Zagreb	6	2	1	3	4	5	−1	7		2–0	0–1	—	0–0
4	(Belgium) Club Brugge	6	0	3	3	4	8	−4	3		1–2	1–1	0–2	—

Source: Soccerway
16 September 2010
19:00

Dinamo Zagreb (Croatia)	2–0	(Spain) Villarreal
Rukavina 18'; Sammir 80'	Report

Stadion Maksimir, Zagreb
Attendance: 17,021
Referee: Pavel Královec (Czech Republic)
16 September 2010
19:00

Club Brugge (Belgium)	1–1	(Greece) PAOK
Kouemaha 61'	Report	Malezas 78'

Jan Breydel Stadium, Bruges
Attendance: 17,525
Referee: Stefan Johannesson (Sweden)

30 September 2010
21:05

PAOK (Greece)	1–0	(Croatia) Dinamo Zagreb
Ivić 56'	Report

Toumba Stadium, Thessaloniki
Attendance: 17,297
Referee: Fredy Fautrel (France)
30 September 2010
21:05

Villarreal (Spain)	2–1	(Belgium) Club Brugge
Rossi 41'; Gonzalo 56'	Report	Donk 45+2'

El Madrigal, Villarreal
Attendance: 14,900
Referee: Maksim Layushkin (Russia)

21 October 2010
21:05

Villarreal (Spain)	1–0	(Greece) PAOK
Ruben 38'	Report

El Madrigal, Villarreal
Attendance: 14,760
Referee: Marcin Borski (Poland)
21 October 2010
21:05

Dinamo Zagreb (Croatia)	0–0	(Belgium) Club Brugge
	Report

Stadion Maksimir, Zagreb
Attendance: 17,270
Referee: Alon Yefet (Israel)

4 November 2010
19:00

PAOK (Greece)	1–0	(Spain) Villarreal
Vieirinha 70'	Report

Toumba Stadium, Thessaloniki
Attendance: 22,779
Referee: Eric Braamhaar (Netherlands)
4 November 2010
19:00

Club Brugge (Belgium)	0–2	(Croatia) Dinamo Zagreb
	Report	Sammir 55'; Bišćan 59'

Jan Breydel Stadium, Bruges
Attendance: 18,300
Referee: Thomas Einwaller (Austria)

2 December 2010
21:05

Villarreal (Spain)	3–0	(Croatia) Dinamo Zagreb
Rossi 25' (pen.), 80'; Ruben 62'	Report

El Madrigal, Villarreal
Attendance: 11,911
Referee: Manuel Gräfe (Germany)
2 December 2010
21:05

PAOK (Greece)	1–1	(Belgium) Club Brugge
Vieirinha 25'	Report	Šćepović 89'

Toumba Stadium, Thessaloniki
Attendance: 19,424
Referee: Mark Courtney (Northern Ireland)

15 December 2010
19:00

Dinamo Zagreb (Croatia)	0–1	(Greece) PAOK
	Report	Salpingidis 60'

Stadion Maksimir, Zagreb
Attendance: 29,226
Referee: Mark Clattenburg (England)
15 December 2010
19:00

Club Brugge (Belgium)	1–2	(Spain) Villarreal
Kouemaha 28'	Report	Rossi 30', 34' (pen.)

Jan Breydel Stadium, Bruges
Attendance: 16,265
Referee: Milorad Mažić (Serbia)

=== Group E ===
Pos	Team	Pld	W	D	L	GF	GA	GD	Pts	Qualification	DK	BTE	AZ	SHF
1	(Ukraine) Dynamo Kyiv	6	3	2	1	10	6	+4	11	Advance to knockout phase	—	2–2	2–0	0–0
2	(Belarus) BATE Borisov	6	3	1	2	11	11	0	10	Advance to knockout phase	1–4	—	4–1	3–1
3	(Netherlands) AZ	6	2	1	3	8	10	−2	7		1–2	3–0	—	2–1
4	(Moldova) Sheriff Tiraspol	6	1	2	3	5	7	−2	5		2–0	0–1	1–1	—

Source: Soccerway
16 September 2010
19:00

AZ (Netherlands)	2–1	(Moldova) Sheriff Tiraspol
Guðmundsson 14'; Jaliens 83'	Report	Moreno 68' (o.g.)

AFAS Stadion, Alkmaar
Attendance: 10,624
Referee: Tony Asumaa (Finland)
16 September 2010
19:00

Dynamo Kyiv (Ukraine)	2–2	(Belarus) BATE Borisov
Milevskyi 34'; Eremenko 44'	Report	Rodionov 3'; Nyakhaychyk 54'

Lobanovsky Dynamo Stadium, Kyiv
Attendance: 12,100
Referee: Markus Strömbergsson (Sweden)

30 September 2010
21:05

BATE Borisov (Belarus)	4–1	(Netherlands) AZ
Rodionov 5'; Kontsevoy 48'; Bressan 77' (pen.); Alyakhnovich 83'	Report	Sigþórsson 89'

Dinamo Stadium, Minsk (Note: BATE Borisov played their group matches in Minsk at Dinamo Stadium as BATE Borisov's Haradski Stadium did not meet UEFA criteria.)
Attendance: 12,153
Referee: Leontios Trattou (Cyprus)
30 September 2010
21:05

Sheriff Tiraspol (Moldova)	2–0	(Ukraine) Dynamo Kyiv
Erokhin 8'; Jymmy 37' (pen.)	Report

Sheriff Stadium, Tiraspol
Attendance: 12,600
Referee: Jiří Jech (Czech Republic)

21 October 2010
21:05

Sheriff Tiraspol (Moldova)	0–1	(Belarus) BATE Borisov
	Report	Sosnovski 8'

Sheriff Stadium, Tiraspol
Attendance: 7,000
Referee: Duarte Gomes (Portugal)
21 October 2010
21:05

AZ (Netherlands)	1–2	(Ukraine) Dynamo Kyiv
Falkenburg 35'	Report	Milevskyi 16'; Khacheridi 40'

AFAS Stadion, Alkmaar
Attendance: 12,338
Referee: Douglas McDonald (Scotland)

4 November 2010
19:00

BATE Borisov (Belarus)	3–1	(Moldova) Sheriff Tiraspol
Rodionov 15'; Pawlaw 70'; Bressan 75'	Report	Erokhin 32'

Dinamo Stadium, Minsk
Attendance: 11,500
Referee: Robert Małek (Poland)
4 November 2010
19:00

Dynamo Kyiv (Ukraine)	2–0	(Netherlands) AZ
Milevskyi 47', 61'	Report

Lobanovsky Dynamo Stadium, Kyiv
Attendance: 15,900
Referee: Espen Berntsen (Norway)

2 December 2010
21:05

Sheriff Tiraspol (Moldova)	1–1	(Netherlands) AZ
Rouamba 54'	Report	Holman 17'

Sheriff Stadium, Tiraspol
Attendance: 3,500
Referee: Cyril Zimmermann (Switzerland)
2 December 2010
21:05

BATE Borisov (Belarus)	1–4	(Ukraine) Dynamo Kyiv
Nyakhaychyk 84'	Report	Vukojević 16'; Yarmolenko 43'; Husyev 50' (pen.); Milevskyi 68'

Dinamo Stadium, Minsk
Attendance: 10,620
Referee: César Muñiz Fernández (Spain)

15 December 2010
19:00

AZ (Netherlands)	3–0	(Belarus) BATE Borisov
Sigþórsson 7', 84'; Maher 86'	Report

AFAS Stadion, Alkmaar
Attendance: 13,852
Referee: Alexandru Deaconu (Romania)
15 December 2010
19:00

Dynamo Kyiv (Ukraine)	0–0	(Moldova) Sheriff Tiraspol
	Report

Lobanovsky Dynamo Stadium, Kyiv
Attendance: 10,800
Referee: Knut Kircher (Germany)

=== Group F ===
Pos	Team	Pld	W	D	L	GF	GA	GD	Pts	Qualification	CSM	SPP	PAL	LAU
1	(Russia) CSKA Moscow	6	5	1	0	18	3	+15	16	Advance to knockout phase	—	3–0	3–1	5–1
2	(Czech Republic) Sparta Prague	6	2	3	1	12	12	0	9	Advance to knockout phase	1–1	—	3–2	3–3
3	(Italy) Palermo	6	2	1	3	7	11	−4	7		0–3	2–2	—	1–0
4	(Switzerland) Lausanne-Sport	6	0	1	5	5	16	−11	1		0–3	1–3	0–1	—

Source: Soccerway
16 September 2010
19:00

Sparta Prague (Czech Republic)	3–2	(Italy) Palermo
Bony 17'; Kladrubský 68'; Kadlec 75'	Report	Maccarone 38'; Hernández 83'

Generali Arena, Prague
Attendance: 13,766
Referee: Anastassios Kakos (Greece)
16 September 2010
19:00

Lausanne-Sport (Switzerland)	0–3	(Russia) CSKA Moscow
	Report	Vágner Love 22', 80' (pen.); Ignashevich 68'

Stade Olympique de la Pontaise, Lausanne
Attendance: 9,531
Referee: Simon Lee Evans (Wales)

30 September 2010
19:00

CSKA Moscow (Russia)	3–0	(Czech Republic) Sparta Prague
Doumbia 72', 86'; González 84' (pen.)	Report

Arena Khimki, Khimki
Attendance: 12,900
Referee: Tommy Skjerven (Norway)
30 September 2010
21:05

Palermo (Italy)	1–0	(Switzerland) Lausanne-Sport
Migliaccio 79'	Report

Stadio Renzo Barbera, Palermo
Attendance: 9,772
Referee: Hannes Kaasik (Estonia)

21 October 2010
21:05

Palermo (Italy)	0–3	(Russia) CSKA Moscow
	Report	Doumbia 34', 59'; Necid 82'

Stadio Renzo Barbera, Palermo
Attendance: 17,548
Referee: Robert Schörgenhofer (Austria)
21 October 2010
21:05

Sparta Prague (Czech Republic)	3–3	(Switzerland) Lausanne-Sport
Bony 10', 24'; Kucka 21'	Report	Meoli 6'; Steuble 75'; Sílvio 90+5'

Generali Arena, Prague
Attendance: 12,430
Referee: Tony Asumaa (Finland)

4 November 2010
19:00

CSKA Moscow (Russia)	3–1	(Italy) Palermo
Honda 47'; Necid 50', 54'	Report	Maccarone 10'

Arena Khimki, Khimki
Attendance: 11,980
Referee: Jorge Sousa (Portugal)
4 November 2010
19:00

Lausanne-Sport (Switzerland)	1–3	(Czech Republic) Sparta Prague
Katz 6'	Report	Bony 45', 90+6'; Kweuke 75'

Stade Olympique de la Pontaise, Lausanne
Attendance: 7,200
Referee: Aleksei Kulbakov (Belarus)

2 December 2010
19:00

CSKA Moscow (Russia)	5–1	(Switzerland) Lausanne-Sport
Necid 18', 82'; Oliseh 22'; Tošić 40'; Dzagoev 71'	Report	Carrupt 90+2'

Arena Khimki, Khimki
Attendance: 4,500
Referee: Michael Weiner (Germany)
2 December 2010
21:05

Palermo (Italy)	2–2	(Czech Republic) Sparta Prague
Rigoni 23'; Pinilla 60' (pen.)	Report	Kladrubský 51' (pen.); Kucka 62'

Stadio Renzo Barbera, Palermo
Attendance: 8,623
Referee: Marijo Strahonja (Croatia)

15 December 2010
19:00

Sparta Prague (Czech Republic)	1–1	(Russia) CSKA Moscow
Kadlec 44'	Report	Dzagoev 15'

Generali Arena, Prague
Attendance: 12,707
Referee: Martin Ingvarsson (Sweden)
15 December 2010
19:00

Lausanne-Sport (Switzerland)	0–1	(Italy) Palermo
	Report	Muñoz 84'

Stade Olympique de la Pontaise, Lausanne
Attendance: 7,150
Referee: Anton Genov (Bulgaria)

=== Group G ===
Pos	Team	Pld	W	D	L	GF	GA	GD	Pts	Qualification	ZNT	AND	AEK	HAJ
1	(Russia) Zenit Saint Petersburg	6	6	0	0	18	6	+12	18	Advance to knockout phase	—	3–1	4–2	2–0
2	(Belgium) Anderlecht	6	2	1	3	8	8	0	7	Advance to knockout phase	1–3	—	3–0	2–0
3	(Greece) AEK Athens	6	2	1	3	9	13	−4	7		0–3	1–1	—	3–1
4	(Croatia) Hajduk Split	6	1	0	5	5	13	−8	3		2–3	1–0	1–3	—

Source: Soccerway
16 September 2010
21:05

Anderlecht (Belgium)	1–3	(Russia) Zenit Saint Petersburg
Juhász 66'	Report	Kerzhakov 8', 33', 44'

Constant Vanden Stock Stadium, Brussels
Attendance: 13,336
Referee: Manuel Gräfe (Germany)
16 September 2010
21:05

AEK Athens (Greece)	3–1	(Croatia) Hajduk Split
Djebbour 12'; Liberopoulos 65'; Scocco 89'	Report	Ibričić 29' (pen.)

Olympic Stadium, Athens
Attendance: 16,182
Referee: Bas Nijhuis (Netherlands)

30 September 2010
19:00

Hajduk Split (Croatia)	1–0	(Belgium) Anderlecht
Vukušić 90+5'	Report

Stadion Poljud, Split
Attendance: 33,000
Referee: Bülent Yıldırım (Turkey)
30 September 2010
19:00

Zenit Saint Petersburg (Russia)	4–2	(Greece) AEK Athens
Hubočan 1'; Alves 13'; Lazović 43' (pen.), 57'	Report	Liberopoulos 37'; Kafes 83' (pen.)

Petrovsky Stadium, Saint Petersburg
Attendance: 21,100
Referee: Milorad Mažić (Serbia)

21 October 2010
19:00

Zenit Saint Petersburg (Russia)	2–0	(Croatia) Hajduk Split
Bukharov 25'; Danny 68'	Report

Petrovsky Stadium, Saint Petersburg
Attendance: 19,500
Referee: Libor Kovařík (Czech Republic)
21 October 2010
19:00

Anderlecht (Belgium)	3–0	(Greece) AEK Athens
Boussoufa 31'; Lukaku 71'; Juhász 75'	Report

Constant Vanden Stock Stadium, Brussels
Attendance: 14,508
Referee: Hannes Kaasik (Estonia)

4 November 2010
21:05

Hajduk Split (Croatia)	2–3	(Russia) Zenit Saint Petersburg
Ljubičić 68'; Vukušić 82'	Report	Ionov 31'; Huszti 47' (pen.); Rosina 50'

Stadion Poljud, Split
Attendance: 28,000
Referee: Eduardo Iturralde González (Spain)
4 November 2010
21:05

AEK Athens (Greece)	1–1	(Belgium) Anderlecht
Blanco 48' (pen.)	Report	Polák 55'

Olympic Stadium, Athens
Attendance: 11,311
Referee: Sascha Kever (Switzerland)

1 December 2010
19:00

Zenit Saint Petersburg (Russia)	3–1	(Belgium) Anderlecht
Ionov 12'; Bukharov 65'; Huszti 88'	Report	Kanu 87'

Petrovsky Stadium, Saint Petersburg
Attendance: 13,900
Referee: Marcin Borski (Poland)
1 December 2010
19:00

Hajduk Split (Croatia)	1–3	(Greece) AEK Athens
Buljat 90'	Report	Scocco 50' (pen.); Manolas 61'; Blanco 84'

Stadion Poljud, Split
Attendance: 13,726
Referee: Mike Dean (England)

16 December 2010
21:05

Anderlecht (Belgium)	2–0	(Croatia) Hajduk Split
De Sutter 12'; Suárez 41'	Report

Constant Vanden Stock Stadium, Brussels
Attendance: 14,979
Referee: Stefan Johannesson (Sweden)
16 December 2010
21:05

AEK Athens (Greece)	0–3	(Russia) Zenit Saint Petersburg
	Report	Bukharov 43'; Rosina 67'; Denisov 88'

Olympic Stadium, Athens
Attendance: 13,605
Referee: Said Ennjimi (France)

=== Group H ===
Pos	Team	Pld	W	D	L	GF	GA	GD	Pts	Qualification	STU	YB	GET	OB
1	(Germany) VfB Stuttgart	6	5	0	1	16	6	+10	15	Advance to knockout phase	—	3–0	1–0	5–1
2	(Switzerland) Young Boys	6	3	0	3	10	10	0	9	Advance to knockout phase	4–2	—	2–0	4–2
3	(Spain) Getafe	6	2	1	3	4	8	−4	7		0–3	1–0	—	2–1
4	(Denmark) Odense	6	1	1	4	8	14	−6	4		1–2	2–0	1–1	—

Source: Soccerway
16 September 2010
21:05

VfB Stuttgart (Germany)	3–0	(Switzerland) Young Boys
Cacau 23' (pen.); Gentner 59'; Tasci 90+1'	Report

Mercedes-Benz Arena, Stuttgart
Attendance: 13,800
Referee: Luca Banti (Italy)
16 September 2010
21:05

Getafe (Spain)	2–1	(Denmark) Odense
Arizmendi 51'; Ríos 81'	Report	Andreasen 44'

Coliseum Alfonso Pérez, Getafe
Attendance: 2,420
Referee: Mark Courtney (Northern Ireland)

30 September 2010
19:00

Odense (Denmark)	1–2	(Germany) VfB Stuttgart
Johansson 78'	Report	Kuzmanović 72'; Harnik 86'

TRE-FOR Park, Odense
Attendance: 8,854
Referee: Alexandru Deaconu (Romania)
30 September 2010
19:00

Young Boys (Switzerland)	2–0	(Spain) Getafe
Degen 11', 64'	Report

Stade de Suisse, Bern
Attendance: 12,830
Referee: Robert Małek (Poland)

21 October 2010
19:00

Young Boys (Switzerland)	4–2	(Denmark) Odense
Bienvenu 25'; Sutter 34'; Degen 61'; Lulić 74'	Report	Utaka 48'; Sørensen 84' (pen.)

Stade de Suisse, Bern
Attendance: 12,511
Referee: Kevin Blom (Netherlands)
21 October 2010
19:00

VfB Stuttgart (Germany)	1–0	(Spain) Getafe
Marica 29'	Report

Mercedes-Benz Arena, Stuttgart
Attendance: 17,400
Referee: Anastassios Kakos (Greece)

4 November 2010
21:05

Odense (Denmark)	2–0	(Switzerland) Young Boys
Andreasen 12', 60'	Report

TRE-FOR Park, Odense
Attendance: 5,334
Referee: Aleksandar Stavrev (Macedonia)
4 November 2010
21:05

Getafe (Spain)	0–3	(Germany) VfB Stuttgart
	Report	Marica 26'; Gebhart 64'; Harnik 76'

Coliseum Alfonso Pérez, Getafe
Attendance: 3,459
Referee: Marijo Strahonja (Croatia)

1 December 2010
19:00

Young Boys (Switzerland)	4–2	(Germany) VfB Stuttgart
Degen 34'; Sutter 78'; Mayuka 81', 82'	Report	Pogrebnyak 48'; Schipplock 68'

Stade de Suisse, Bern
Attendance: 18,627
Referee: Alon Yefet (Israel)
1 December 2010
19:00

Odense (Denmark)	1–1	(Spain) Getafe
Andreasen 90+2'	Report	Ríos 17'

TRE-FOR Park, Odense
Attendance: 5,599
Referee: Hannes Kaasik (Estonia)

16 December 2010
21:05

VfB Stuttgart (Germany)	5–1	(Denmark) Odense
Gebhart 20'; Høegh 48' (o.g.); Gentner 65'; Møller Christensen 70' (o.g.); Marica 90+3'	Report	Utaka 72'

Mercedes-Benz Arena, Stuttgart
Attendance: 14,000
Referee: Terje Hauge (Norway)
16 December 2010
21:05

Getafe (Spain)	1–0	(Switzerland) Young Boys
Sardinero 15'	Report

Coliseum Alfonso Pérez, Getafe
Attendance: 1,631
Referee: Pieter Vink (Netherlands)

=== Group I ===
Pos	Team	Pld	W	D	L	GF	GA	GD	Pts	Qualification	PSV	MET	SAM	DEB
1	(Netherlands) PSV Eindhoven	6	4	2	0	10	3	+7	14	Advance to knockout phase	—	0–0	1–1	3–0
2	(Ukraine) Metalist Kharkiv	6	3	2	1	9	4	+5	11	Advance to knockout phase	0–2	—	2–1	2–1
3	(Italy) Sampdoria	6	1	2	3	4	7	−3	5		1–2	0–0	—	1–0
4	(Hungary) Debrecen	6	1	0	5	4	13	−9	3		1–2	0–5	2–0	—

Source: Soccerway
16 September 2010
21:05

Debrecen (Hungary)	0–5	(Ukraine) Metalist Kharkiv
	Report	Edmar 24', 74'; Xavier 34'; Fininho 77'; Valyayev 89'

Ferenc Puskás Stadium, Budapest (Note: Debrecen played their group matches in Budapest at Ferenc Puskás Stadium as Debrecen's Stadion Oláh Gábor Út did not meet UEFA criteria.)
Attendance: 8,000
Referee: Aleksandar Stavrev (Macedonia)
16 September 2010
21:05

PSV Eindhoven (Netherlands)	1–1	(Italy) Sampdoria
Dzsudzsák 90'	Report	Cacciatore 25'

Philips Stadion, Eindhoven
Attendance: 17,500
Referee: Knut Kircher (Germany)

30 September 2010
19:00

Sampdoria (Italy)	1–0	(Hungary) Debrecen
Pazzini 18' (pen.)	Report

Stadio Luigi Ferraris, Genoa
Attendance: 12,159
Referee: Libor Kovařík (Czech Republic)
30 September 2010
19:00

Metalist Kharkiv (Ukraine)	0–2	(Netherlands) PSV Eindhoven
	Report	Dzsudzsák 27' (pen.); Berg 30'

Metalist Stadium, Kharkiv
Attendance: 38,100
Referee: Tony Chapron (France)

21 October 2010
19:00

Metalist Kharkiv (Ukraine)	2–1	(Italy) Sampdoria
Taison 38'; Xavier 73'	Report	Koman 32'

Metalist Stadium, Kharkiv
Attendance: 34,580
Referee: Florian Meyer (Germany)
21 October 2010
19:00

Debrecen (Hungary)	1–2	(Netherlands) PSV Eindhoven
Mijadinoski 35'	Report	Engelaar 40'; Dzsudzsák 66'

Ferenc Puskás Stadium, Budapest
Attendance: 18,000
Referee: Nicolai Vollquartz (Denmark)

4 November 2010
21:05

Sampdoria (Italy)	0–0	(Ukraine) Metalist Kharkiv
	Report

Stadio Luigi Ferraris, Genoa
Attendance: 13,259
Referee: Fernando Teixeira Vitienes (Spain)
4 November 2010
21:05

PSV Eindhoven (Netherlands)	3–0	(Hungary) Debrecen
Afellay 22'; Reis 44'; Wuytens 88'	Report

Philips Stadion, Eindhoven
Attendance: 15,000
Referee: Mark Courtney (Northern Ireland)

1 December 2010
19:00

Metalist Kharkiv (Ukraine)	2–1	(Hungary) Debrecen
Bódi 52' (o.g.); Oliynyk 88'	Report	Czvitkovics 48'

Metalist Stadium, Kharkiv
Attendance: 31,200
Referee: Daniel Stalhammar (Sweden)
1 December 2010
19:00

Sampdoria (Italy)	1–2	(Netherlands) PSV Eindhoven
Pazzini 45+3'	Report	Toivonen 51', 90'

Stadio Luigi Ferraris, Genoa
Attendance: 12,131
Referee: Markus Strömbergsson (Sweden)

16 December 2010
21:05

Debrecen (Hungary)	2–0	(Italy) Sampdoria
Kabát 48'; Volta 86' (o.g.)	Report

Ferenc Puskás Stadium, Budapest
Attendance: 5,500
Referee: Stanislav Sukhina (Russia)
16 December 2010
21:05

PSV Eindhoven (Netherlands)	0–0	(Ukraine) Metalist Kharkiv
	Report

Philips Stadion, Eindhoven
Attendance: 15,300
Referee: Anastassios Kakos (Greece)

=== Group J ===
Pos	Team	Pld	W	D	L	GF	GA	GD	Pts	Qualification	PSG	SEV	DOR	KAR
1	(France) Paris Saint-Germain	6	3	3	0	9	4	+5	12	Advance to knockout phase	—	4–2	0–0	2–0
2	(Spain) Sevilla	6	3	1	2	10	7	+3	10	Advance to knockout phase	0–1	—	2–2	4–0
3	(Germany) Borussia Dortmund	6	2	3	1	10	7	+3	9		1–1	0–1	—	3–0
4	(Ukraine) Karpaty Lviv	6	0	1	5	4	15	−11	1		1–1	0–1	3–4	—

Source: Soccerway
16 September 2010
21:05

Karpaty Lviv (Ukraine)	3–4	(Germany) Borussia Dortmund
Holodyuk 44'; Kopolovets 52'; Kozhanov 78'	Report	Şahin 12' (pen.); Götze 27', 90+2'; Barrios 87'

Ukraina Stadium, Lviv
Attendance: 27,700
Referee: Claudio Circhetta (Switzerland)
16 September 2010
21:05

Sevilla (Spain)	0–1	(France) Paris Saint-Germain
	Report	Nenê 75'

Ramón Sánchez Pizjuán, Seville
Attendance: 24,960
Referee: Robert Schörgenhofer (Austria)

30 September 2010
19:00

Paris Saint-Germain (France)	2–0	(Ukraine) Karpaty Lviv
Jallet 4'; Nenê 20'	Report

Parc des Princes, Paris
Attendance: 9,117
Referee: Marijo Strahonja (Croatia)
30 September 2010
19:00

Borussia Dortmund (Germany)	0–1	(Spain) Sevilla
	Report	Cigarini 45+1'

Westfalenstadion, Dortmund
Attendance: 49,100
Referee: Mike Dean (England)

21 October 2010
19:00

Borussia Dortmund (Germany)	1–1	(France) Paris Saint-Germain
Şahin 50' (pen.)	Report	Chantôme 87'

Westfalenstadion, Dortmund
Attendance: 50,200
Referee: Jonas Eriksson (Sweden)
21 October 2010
19:00

Karpaty Lviv (Ukraine)	0–1	(Spain) Sevilla
	Report	Kanouté 34'

Ukraina Stadium, Lviv
Attendance: 27,925
Referee: Bas Nijhuis (Netherlands)

4 November 2010
21:05

Paris Saint-Germain (France)	0–0	(Germany) Borussia Dortmund
	Report

Parc des Princes, Paris
Attendance: 26,204
Referee: Pavel Královec (Czech Republic)
4 November 2010
21:05

Sevilla (Spain)	4–0	(Ukraine) Karpaty Lviv
Alfaro 9', 42'; Cigarini 31'; Negredo 51'	Report

Ramón Sánchez Pizjuán, Seville
Attendance: 21,394
Referee: Bülent Yıldırım (Turkey)

2 December 2010
19:00

Borussia Dortmund (Germany)	3–0	(Ukraine) Karpaty Lviv
Kagawa 5'; Hummels 49'; Lewandowski 89'	Report

Westfalenstadion, Dortmund
Attendance: 40,100
Referee: Eric Braamhaar (Netherlands)
2 December 2010
19:00

Paris Saint-Germain (France)	4–2	(Spain) Sevilla
Bodmer 17'; Hoarau 20', 47'; Nenê 45'	Report	Kanouté 32', 36'

Parc des Princes, Paris
Attendance: 18,783
Referee: Luca Banti (Italy)

15 December 2010
21:05

Karpaty Lviv (Ukraine)	1–1	(France) Paris Saint-Germain
Fedetskiy 45'	Report	Luyindula 39'

Ukraina Stadium, Lviv
Attendance: 14,000
Referee: Espen Berntsen (Norway)
15 December 2010
21:05

Sevilla (Spain)	2–2	(Germany) Borussia Dortmund
Romaric 31'; Kanouté 35'	Report	Kagawa 4'; Subotić 49'

Ramón Sánchez Pizjuán, Seville
Attendance: 27,062
Referee: Aleksei Nikolaev (Russia)

=== Group K ===
Pos	Team	Pld	W	D	L	GF	GA	GD	Pts	Qualification	LIV	NAP	STE	UTR
1	(England) Liverpool	6	2	4	0	8	3	+5	10	Advance to knockout phase	—	3–1	4–1	0–0
2	(Italy) Napoli	6	1	4	1	8	9	−1	7	Advance to knockout phase	0–0	—	1–0	0–0
3	(Romania) Steaua București	6	1	3	2	9	11	−2	6		1–1	3–3	—	3–1
4	(Netherlands) Utrecht	6	0	5	1	5	7	−2	5		0–0	3–3	1–1	—

Source: Soccerway
16 September 2010
21:05

Napoli (Italy)	0–0	(Netherlands) Utrecht
	Report

Stadio San Paolo, Naples
Attendance: 25,897
Referee: István Vad (Hungary)
16 September 2010
21:05

Liverpool (England)	4–1	(Romania) Steaua București
Cole 1'; Ngog 55' (pen.), 90+1'; Lucas 81'	Report	Tănase 13'

Anfield, Liverpool
Attendance: 25,605
Referee: César Muñiz Fernández (Spain)

30 September 2010
19:00

Steaua București (Romania)	3–3	(Italy) Napoli
Cribari 2' (o.g.); Tănase 11'; Kapetanos 16'	Report	Vitale 44'; Hamšík 73'; Cavani 90+8'

Stadionul Steaua, Bucharest
Attendance: 10,203
Referee: Marcin Borski (Poland)
30 September 2010
19:00

Utrecht (Netherlands)	0–0	(England) Liverpool
	Report

Stadion Galgenwaard, Utrecht
Attendance: 23,662
Referee: Duarte Gomes (Portugal)

21 October 2010
19:00

Utrecht (Netherlands)	1–1	(Romania) Steaua București
Duplan 60'	Report	Schut 75' (o.g.)

Stadion Galgenwaard, Utrecht
Attendance: 24,000
Referee: Said Ennjimi (France)
21 October 2010
19:00

Napoli (Italy)	0–0	(England) Liverpool
	Report

Stadio San Paolo, Naples
Attendance: 52,910
Referee: Thorsten Kinhöfer (Germany)

4 November 2010
21:05

Steaua București (Romania)	3–1	(Netherlands) Utrecht
Gardoș 29'; Stancu 52', 53'	Report	Mertens 33'

Stadionul Steaua, Bucharest
Attendance: 8,322
Referee: Stanislav Sukhina (Russia)
4 November 2010
21:05

Liverpool (England)	3–1	(Italy) Napoli
Gerrard 76', 88' (pen.), 89'	Report	Lavezzi 28'

Anfield, Liverpool
Attendance: 33,892
Referee: Fredy Fautrel (France)

2 December 2010
19:00

Utrecht (Netherlands)	3–3	(Italy) Napoli
Van Wolfswinkel 6', 28' (pen.); Demouge 35'	Report	Cavani 5', 42', 70' (pen.)

Stadion Galgenwaard, Utrecht
Attendance: 22,500
Referee: Eduardo Iturralde González (Spain)
2 December 2010
19:00

Steaua București (Romania)	1–1	(England) Liverpool
Bonfim 61'	Report	Jovanović 19'

Stadionul Steaua, Bucharest
Attendance: 13,639
Referee: Bülent Yıldırım (Turkey)

15 December 2010
21:05

Napoli (Italy)	1–0	(Romania) Steaua București
Cavani 90+3'	Report

Stadio San Paolo, Naples
Attendance: 40,631
Referee: Pavel Královec (Czech Republic)
15 December 2010
21:05

Liverpool (England)	0–0	(Netherlands) Utrecht
	Report

Anfield, Liverpool
Attendance: 37,800
Referee: Kristinn Jakobsson (Iceland)

=== Group L ===
Pos	Team	Pld	W	D	L	GF	GA	GD	Pts	Qualification	POR	BJK	RPD	CSS
1	(Portugal) Porto	6	5	1	0	14	4	+10	16	Advance to knockout phase	—	1–1	3–0	3–1
2	(Turkey) Beşiktaş	6	4	1	1	9	6	+3	13	Advance to knockout phase	1–3	—	2–0	1–0
3	(Austria) Rapid Wien	6	1	0	5	5	12	−7	3		1–3	1–2	—	1–2
4	(Bulgaria) CSKA Sofia	6	1	0	5	4	10	−6	3		0–1	1–2	0–2	—

Source: Soccerway
16 September 2010
21:05

Beşiktaş (Turkey)	1–0	(Bulgaria) CSKA Sofia
Ernst 90'	Report

BJK İnönü Stadium, Istanbul
Attendance: 25,035
Referee: Laurent Duhamel (France)
16 September 2010
21:05

Porto (Portugal)	3–0	(Austria) Rapid Wien
Rolando 26'; Falcao 65'; Micael 77'	Report

Estádio do Dragão, Porto
Attendance: 30,014
Referee: Douglas McDonald (Scotland)

30 September 2010
19:00

Rapid Wien (Austria)	1–2	(Turkey) Beşiktaş
Kavlak 51'	Report	Hološko 55'; Bobô 64'

Ernst-Happel-Stadion, Vienna (Note: Rapid Wien played their home group matches at Ernst-Happel-Stadion as it has a greater capacity than their Gerhard Hanappi Stadium.)
Attendance: 50,000
Referee: Aleksei Kulbakov (Belarus)
30 September 2010
19:00

CSKA Sofia (Bulgaria)	0–1	(Portugal) Porto
	Report	Falcao 16'

Vasil Levski National Stadium, Sofia (Note: CSKA Sofia played their group matches in Sofia at Vasil Levski National Stadium as CSKA Sofia's Balgarska Armiya Stadium was closed at the end of the previous season because it didn't meet the BFU and UEFA criteria.)
Attendance: 10,600
Referee: Alon Yefet (Israel)

21 October 2010
19:00

CSKA Sofia (Bulgaria)	0–2	(Austria) Rapid Wien
	Report	Vennegoor of Hesselink 28'; Hofmann 32'

Vasil Levski National Stadium, Sofia
Attendance: 7,996
Referee: Leontios Trattou (Cyprus)
21 October 2010
19:00

Beşiktaş (Turkey)	1–3	(Portugal) Porto
Bobô 90+2'	Report	Falcao 26'; Hulk 59', 78'

BJK İnönü Stadium, Istanbul
Attendance: 21,722
Referee: Carlos Clos Gómez (Spain)

4 November 2010
21:05

Rapid Wien (Austria)	1–2	(Bulgaria) CSKA Sofia
Salihi 56' (pen.)	Report	Yanchev 50'; Marquinhos 64'

Ernst-Happel-Stadion, Vienna
Attendance: 48,200
Referee: Simon Lee Evans (Wales)
4 November 2010
21:05

Porto (Portugal)	1–1	(Turkey) Beşiktaş
Falcao 36' (pen.)	Report	Nihat 62'

Estádio do Dragão, Porto
Attendance: 34,139
Referee: Paolo Tagliavento (Italy)

2 December 2010
19:00

CSKA Sofia (Bulgaria)	1–2	(Turkey) Beşiktaş
Sheridan 79'	Report	Zápotočný 59'; Hološko 64'

Vasil Levski National Stadium, Sofia
Attendance: 9,100
Referee: Tom Harald Hagen (Norway)
2 December 2010
19:00

Rapid Wien (Austria)	1–3	(Portugal) Porto
Trimmel 39'	Report	Falcao 42', 86', 88'

Ernst-Happel-Stadion, Vienna
Attendance: 47,200
Referee: Aleksandar Stavrev (Macedonia)

15 December 2010
21:05

Beşiktaş (Turkey)	2–0	(Austria) Rapid Wien
Quaresma 32'; Ernst 45'	Report

BJK İnönü Stadium, Istanbul
Attendance: 16,686
Referee: Peter Rasmussen (Denmark)
15 December 2010
21:05

Porto (Portugal)	3–1	(Bulgaria) CSKA Sofia
Otamendi 22'; Micael 54'; J. Rodríguez 90+3'	Report	Delev 48'

Estádio do Dragão, Porto
Attendance: 22,930
Referee: Claudio Circhetta (Switzerland)
