= Pavel =

- Gender: Male

Origin
- Origin: Latin

Other names
- Related names: Paul, Paulus, Pavol

Pavel (Bulgarian, Russian, Serbian: Павел; Czech, Slovene, and Romanian: Pavel (although Romanian also uses Paul); Polish: Paweł; Slovak: Pavol; Ukrainian: Павло, romanized: Pavlo) is a male given name. It is a Slavic cognate of the name Paul (derived from the Greek Pavlos). Pavel may refer to:

== People ==
=== Given name ===
- Pavel I of Russia (1754–1801), Emperor of Russia
- Pavel Durov (born 1984), Telegram founder
- Pavel Graudyn (born 2006), Russian fencer
- Pavel Haas (1899–1944), Czech composer who was murdered during the Holocaust
- Pavel Kastusik (born 1978), Belarusian artist
- Pavel Kustov (born 1965), Soviet ski jumper
- Pavel Kuzmich (born 1988), Russian luger
- Pavel Nedvěd (born 1972), Czech footballer
- Pavel Prigozhin (born 1998), son of Russian oligarch Yevgeny Prigozhin
- Pavel Schenk (1941–2025), Czech volleyball player
- Pavel Starostin (born 1955), Estonian politician
- Pavel Traubner (1941–2024), Slovak neurologist
- Pavel (film director), an Indian Bengali film director

=== Surname ===
- Ágoston Pável (1886–1946), Hungarian Slovene writer, poet, ethnologist, linguist and historian
- Andrei Pavel (born 1974), Romanian tennis coach and former professional tennis player
- Claudia Pavel (born 1984), Romanian pop singer and dancer also known as Claudia Cream
- Elisabeth Pavel (born 1990), Romanian basketball player
- Ernst Pavel, Romanian sprint canoeist who competed in the early 1970s
- Harry Pavel (born 1951), German wheelchair curler, 2018 Winter Paralympian
- Lacra Pavel (born 1965), Romanian and Canadian game theorist
- Marcel Pavel (born 1959), Romanian folk singer
- Ondřej Pavel (born 2000), Czech ice hockey player
- Pavel Pavel (born 1957), Czech engineer and experimental archaeologist
- Petr Pavel (born 1961), Czech army general, president of Czech Republic

== Fictional characters ==
- Pavel Korchagin, in How the Steel Was Tempered
- Pavel Chekov, in Star Trek
- Doctor Leonid Pavel, in The Dark Knight Rises
- Pavel Fyodorovich Smerdyakov, in The Brothers Karamazov
- Fra Pavel, in His Dark Materials
- Pavel, in The Boy in the Striped Pyjamas
- Pavel Morozov, in Metro: Last Light
- Pavel, in Grand Theft Auto Online
- Pavel, in Epic Seven
- Pavel Vlasov in Mother
- Hodari Pavel, in Palia
- Pavel Yudin, Fear & Hunger 2: Termina
- Pavel Pavlovich Antipov / Strelnikov, in Doctor Zhivago

== See also ==
- Paval (disambiguation)
- Pavol
- Pavao (given name)
- Pavle
