= Pavol Barmoš =

Slovak footballer

Personal information
- Date of birth: 29 June 1981 (age 45)
- Place of birth: Czechoslovakia
- Height: 1.82 m (6 ft 0 in)
- Position: Centre back

Team information
- Current team: Hédervári KSE

Youth career
- Inter Bratislava

Senior career*
| Years | Team | Apps | (Gls) |
| –2006 | Inter Bratislava | 72 | (0) |
| 2000–2001 | → OŠK Slovenský Grob (loan) | | |
| 2001–2002 | → ŠKP Devín (loan) | | |
| 2006 | → Dunajská Streda (loan) | | |
| 2006–2008 | FK Vėtra | | |
| 2008 | Mattersburg | 0 | (0) |
| 2009–2010 | TJ Malinovo | | |
| 2010–2014 | Inter Bratislava | | |
| 2015– | Hédervári KSE | | |
- * Club domestic league appearances and goals as of 26 February 2017

Pavol Barmoš (born 26 June 1981) is a Slovak football defender who currently plays for Hédervári KSE. Barmoš's father, Jozef Barmoš was also a professional footballer.
