= Pablo Hernández =

Pablo Hernández may refer to:

- Pablo Hernández (footballer, born 1975), Uruguayan football defender
- Pablo Hernández (footballer, born 1985), Spanish football attacking midfielder and winger
- Pablo Hernández (footballer, born 1986), Chilean football midfielder for San Martín Tucumán
- Pablo Hernández (footballer, born 2000), Spanish football midfielder for Melilla
- Pablo Hernández (gymnast), Cuban gymnast
- Pablo Hernández (cyclist) (1940–2021), Colombian cyclist
- Pablo Franco Hernández (born 1963), Mexican lawyer and politician
- Pablo Hernández de Cos (born 1971), Spanish economist
