= Paval, Iran =

Paval پاول
- Village
- Location within Iran
- Coordinates: 28°34′29″N 61°17′43″E
- Country: Iran
- Province: Sistan and Baluchestan
- County: Khash
- Bakhsh: Central
- Rural District: Sangan

Population (2006)
  - Total: 118
- Time zone: UTC+3:30 (IRST)
  - Summer (DST): UTC+4:30 (IRDT)

Paval (Persian: پاول, also Romanized as Pāval) is a village in Sangan Rural District, in the Central District of Khash County, Sistan and Baluchestan Province, Iran. At the 2006 census, its population was 118, in 36 families.
