= Pavol Pilár =

Slovak footballer

Personal information
- Full name: Pavol Pilár
- Date of birth: 27 July 1986 (age 40)
- Place of birth: Trstená, Czechoslovakia
- Height: 1.84 m (6 ft 1/2 in)
- Position: Centre forward

Team information
- Current team: FK Habovka-Blatná SŽ
- Number: 22

Youth career
- 1990–2004: TJ Blatná Habovka
- 2004–2005: MFK Ružomberok

Senior career*
Years	Team	Apps	(Gls)
2005–2012	Ružomberok	98	(3)
2012–	FK Blatná Habovka		

International career
- Slovakia U-21
- * Club domestic league appearances and goals as of 30 May 2012

Pavol Pilár (born 27 July 1986 in Trstená) is a Slovak footballer.

The striker started his career with TJ Blatná Habovka and joined 2004 to Slovak Corgoň Liga club MFK Ružomberok.
