= Jeanvion Yulu-Matondo =

Zairian footballer

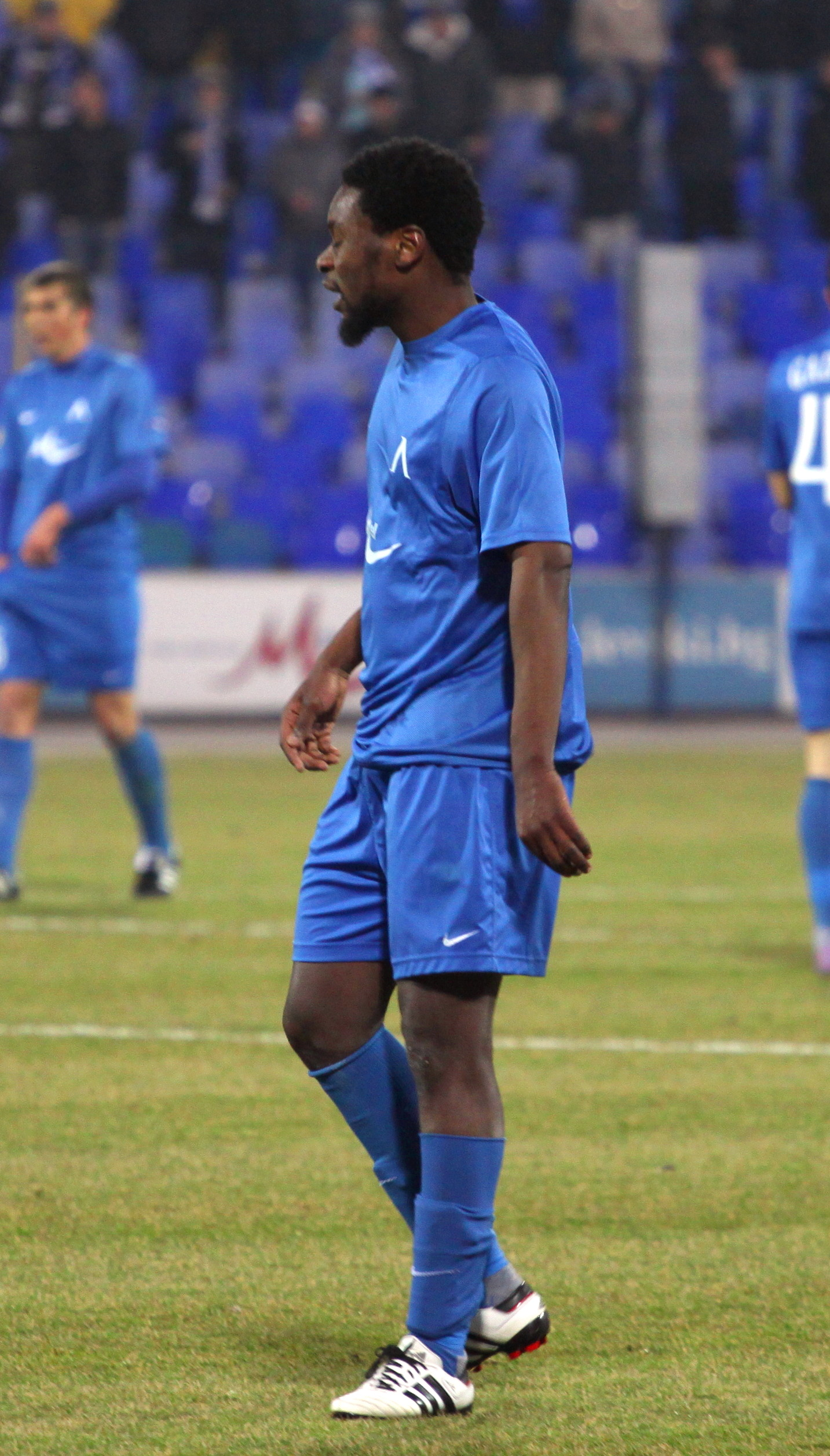

Personal information
- Date of birth: 5 January 1986 (age 40)
- Place of birth: Kinshasa, Zaire
- Height: 1.80 m (5 ft 11 in)
- Position: Striker

Youth career
- Ans
- Mouscroun
- Club Brugge

Senior career*
Years	Team	Apps	(Gls)
2005–2007	Club Brugge	42	(11)
2007–2010	Roda JC	80	(12)
2010–2011	Levski Sofia	8	(3)
2011–2013	Westerlo	14	(0)
2013	Bury	0	(0)
2014–2015	Al Ittihad	13	(1)
2015	Oțelul Galați	6	(0)
2017–2018	Crossing Schaerbeek		

International career
2002	Belgium U16	2	(0)
2003	Belgium U17	8	(0)
2003–2004	Belgium U18	3	(0)
2004–2005	Belgium U19	9	(1)
2005–2008	Belgium U21	17	(7)
- * Club domestic league appearances and goals

Jeanvion Yulu-Matondo (born 5 January 1986) is a Belgian former footballer with Congolese roots who played as a striker.

== Career ==
=== Youth career ===
Yulu-Matondo started his career at the small team of R. Ans F.C. but was discovered by Jupiler League team R.E. Mouscron where he joined the youth team. He developed further with Club Brugge, where he has successfully managed the step from the youth team to the first team.

=== Club Brugge K.V. ===
After four years in the youth team, Yulu-Matondo started playing for the first team of Club Brugge in 2005. He scored a goal for Club Brugge in the UEFA Champions League against Juventus.

=== Roda JC ===
In the summer of 2007, he moved from Club Brugge to Roda JC.

=== Levski Sofia ===
On 30 January 2011, it was announced that Levski Sofia had signed Yulu-Matondo.

=== K.V.C. Westerlo ===
On 8 September 2011, he returned to near Belgium, joining K.V.C. Westerlo and signing a one-year contract.

=== Bury FC ===
On 11 February 2013, Jeanvion Yulu-Matondo signed for then League 1 outfit Bury on non-contract terms after a three-week trial. But after playing in a reserve game against Bolton Wanderers, he was let go by manager Kevin Blackwell.

== Honours ==
Club Brugge

- Belgian Cup: 2006–07
