= Pablo López (footballer, born 1982) =

Argentine footballer

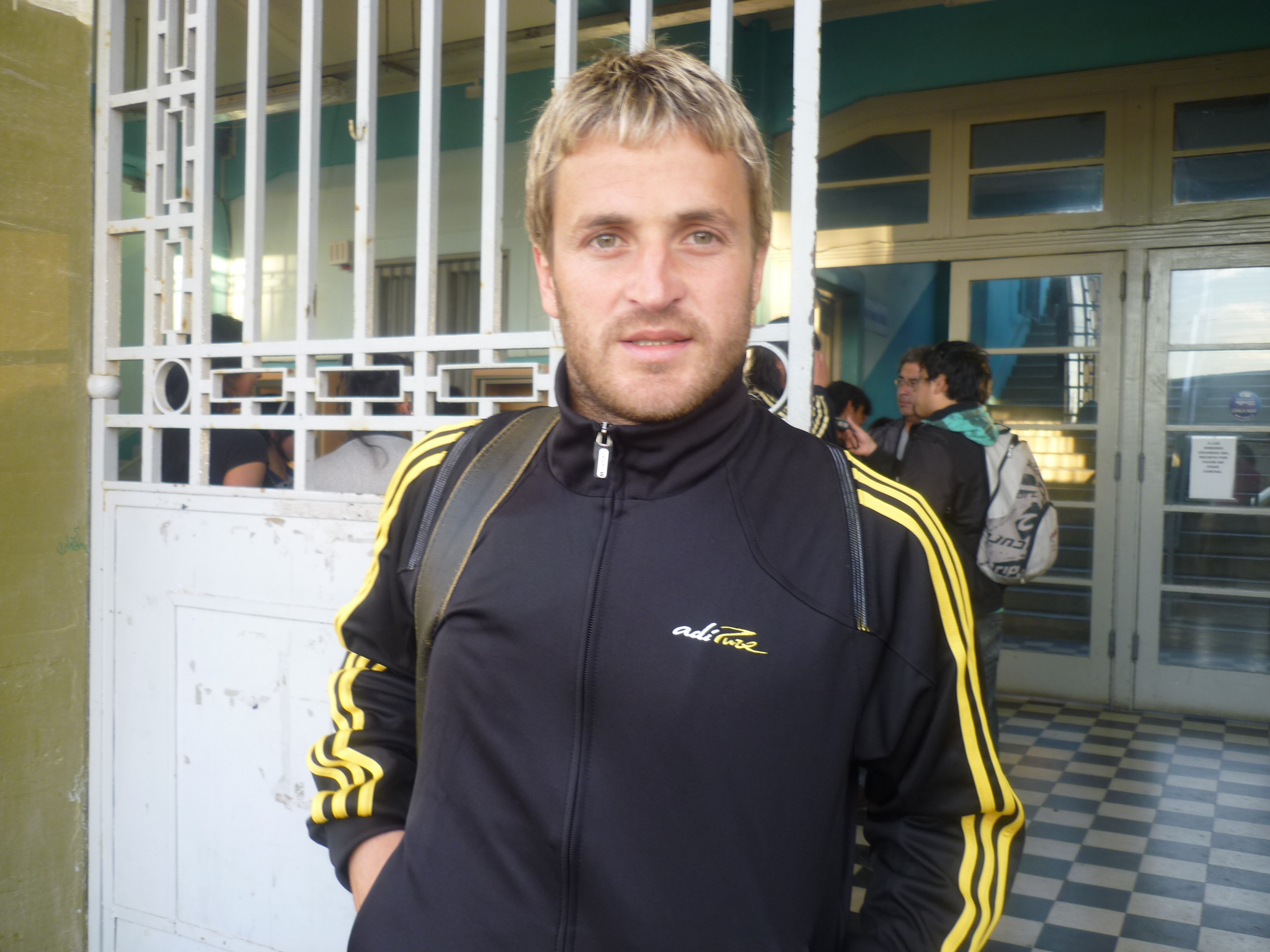
Pablo Darío López

Pablo Darío López (born 1982-06-04 in Lomas de Zamora) is a former Argentine football midfielder.

== Career ==
This player played in teams for Deportivo Español, C.A.I., Deportivo Cuenca, San Martín de Tucumán, Chacarita Juniors and Santiago Wanderers.

Pablo López was one of the stars of Santiago Wanderers with Joel Soto, Moisés Villarroel, Rodrigo Barra and Eric Godoy which led to playing in total 29 official games for the club and 14 goals officials in tournaments.

== Club history ==
- Deportivo Español 1998–2003
- C.A.I. 2003
- Deportivo Cuenca 2004
- San Martín de Tucumán 2004–2006
- Chacarita Juniors 2006–2007
- San Martín de Tucumán 2007–2008
- Santiago Wanderers 2008–2011
- Huracán 2011–2012
- Banfield 2012–2013
- San Martín de San Juan 2013–2014
- Audax Italiano 2014–2016
- Deportivo Español 2016–2020

== Titles ==
- Torneo Argentino A: San Martín de Tucumán, 2006-C
- Primera B Nacional: San Martín de Tucumán, 2007-2008
