= Pablo Soto (footballer) =

Chilean footballer (born 1995)

Personal information
- Full name: Pablo César Soto Soto
- Date of birth: 7 February 1995 (age 31)
- Place of birth: Santiago, Chile
- Height: 1.83 m (6 ft 0 in)
- Position: Goalkeeper

Youth career
- 2007–2012: Colo-Colo

Senior career*
Years	Team	Apps	(Gls)
2013–2014	Colo-Colo B	8	(0)
2015–2018	Colo-Colo	0	(0)
2016–2017	→ Deportes Valdivia (loan)	0	(0)
2019	Fernández Vial	20	(0)
2020–2021	Deportes Colina	7	(0)
Total		35	(0)

International career
2014	Chile U20		
- * Club domestic league appearances and goals

Pablo César Soto Soto (born 7 February 1995) is a Chilean former footballer who played as a goalkeeper.

== Career ==
He professionally debuted with the first adult team in a 3–2 Copa Chile defeat with Unión San Felipe on 3 June 2013.

In the 2020 season, Soto played for Deportes Colina in the Segunda División Profesional de Chile.

At international level, Soto represented Chile at under-20 level in the 2014 Aspire Four Nations International Tournament in Qatar.

== Career statistics ==
As of matches played on 25 November 2018.

Club	Season	League			Cup		Total	
Club	Season	Division	Apps	Goals	Apps	Goals	Apps	Goals
Colo-Colo B	2013	Chilean Segunda División	4	0	0	0	4	0
Colo-Colo B	2013–14	Chilean Segunda División	4	0	0	0	4	0
Colo-Colo B	Totals		8	0	0	0	8	0
Colo-Colo	2013–14	Chilean Primera División	0	0	1	0	1	0
Colo-Colo	2014–15	Chilean Primera División	0	0	0	0	0	0
Colo-Colo	2015–16	Chilean Primera División	0	0	0	0	0	0
Colo-Colo	2017	Chilean Primera División	0	0	0	0	0	0
Colo-Colo	2018	Chilean Primera División	0	0	0	0	0	0
Colo-Colo	Totals		0	0	1	0	1	0
Deportes Valdivia (loan)	2016–17	Primera B	0	0	0	0	0	0
Career totals			8	0	1	0	9	0
