= Daniel Mladenov =

Bulgarian footballer

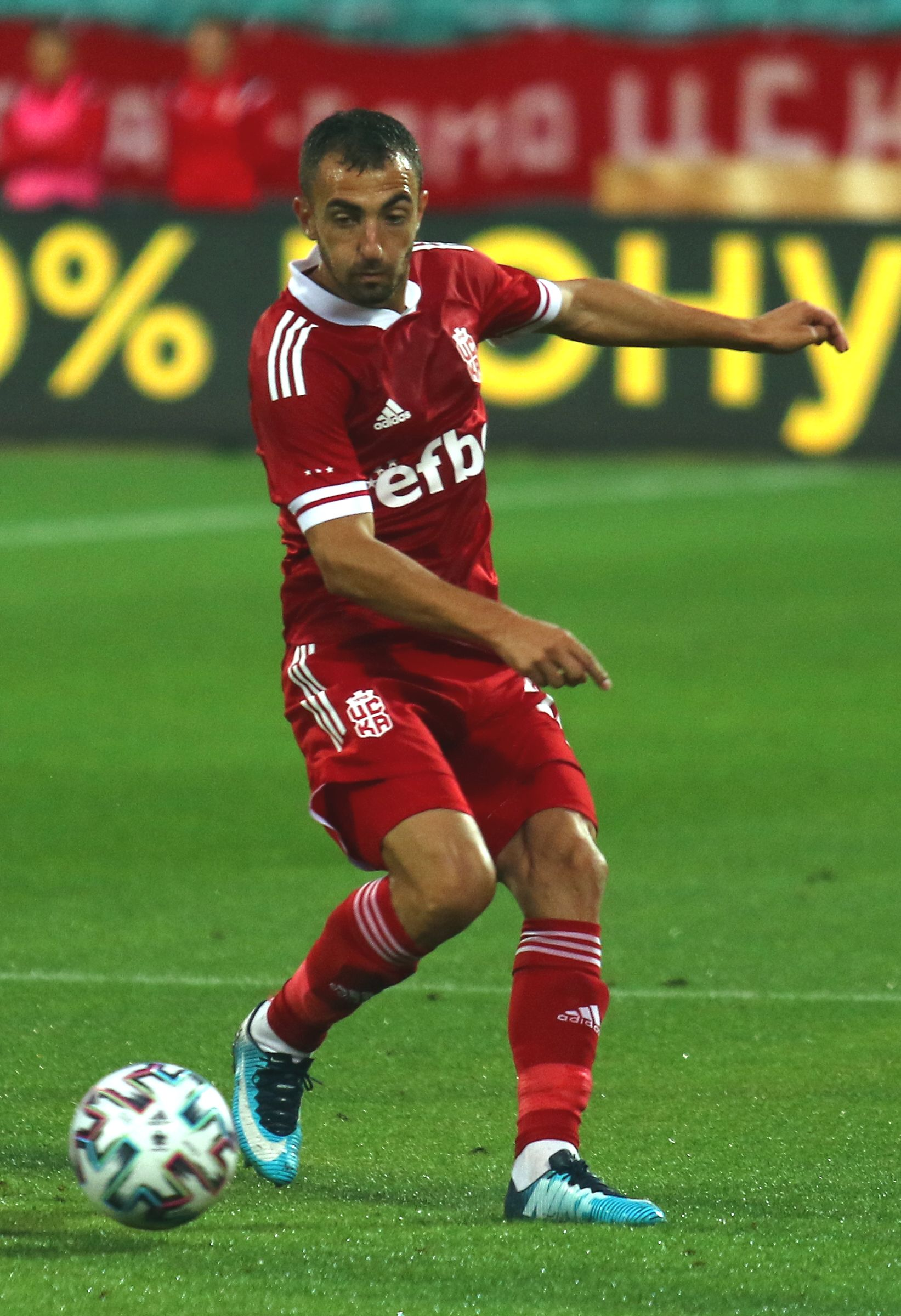
- Mladenov playing for CSKA 1948 in 2020

Personal information
- Full name: Daniel Ventsislavov Mladenov
- Date of birth: 25 May 1987 (age 39)
- Place of birth: Kyustendil, PR Bulgaria
- Height: 1.76 m (5 ft 9 in)
- Position: Winger

Team information
- Current team: Kyustendil (player-manager)
- Number: 11

Senior career*
Years	Team	Apps	(Gls)
2006–2007	Velbazhd Kyustendil	20	(4)
2007–2008	Marek Dupnitsa	27	(5)
2008–2010	Pirin Blagoevgrad	43	(6)
2010–2012	Levski Sofia	44	(7)
2012	Chernomorets Burgas	6	(0)
2013	Montana	14	(2)
2013	Marek Dupnitsa	1	(1)
2013	Cherno More	9	(1)
2014	Marek Dupnitsa	4	(0)
2014	Trikala	10	(5)
2014–2015	Oborishte	16	(16)
2015	Septemvri Simitli	16	(6)
2016–2017	Pirin Blagoevgrad	39	(12)
2017–2019	Etar Veliko Tarnovo	56	(20)
2020	CSKA 1948	17	(3)
2021–2023	Etar Veliko Tarnovo	69	(21)
2023–2024	Yantra Gabrovo	34	(14)
2024–	Kyustendil	52	(41)

International career
2007	Bulgaria U21	1	(0)
2019	Bulgaria	2	(0)

Managerial career
- 2024–: Kyustendil (player-manager)
- * Club domestic league appearances and goals as of 09:28, 18 January 2026 (UTC)

Daniel Ventsislavov Mladenov (Bulgarian: Даниел Венциславов Младенов; born 25 May 1987) is a Bulgarian professional footballer who plays as a winger and is currently a playing manager at Kyustendil.

== Career ==
=== Youth career ===
Mladenov started his career in his home town Kyustendil in the local team, Velbazhd.

=== Marek Dupnitsa ===
In June 2007, Mladenov signed a contract for three years with Marek Dupnitsa.

=== Pirin Blagoevgrad ===
One year later, in 2008, Daniel signed with PFC Pirin Blagoevgrad.

=== Levski Sofia ===
On 9 June 2010, he signed his 3-year contract. On 30 June 2010, he made his unofficial debut for Levski in a match against FCM Târgu Mureş. Mladenov entered the match as a substitute and scored 2 goals.

Mladenov officially debuted for Levski in a Europa League match against Dundalk F.C. The Blues won the first match and the result was 6:0. Mladenov scored two of the goals.

On 16 December 2010, Mladenov netted the only goal (right at the end of the first half) for Levski Sofia in the 1:0 home win against Sporting CP in the final UEFA Europa League match of the group phase. However, the team from Sofia had already been eliminated from the competition.

=== Chernomorets Burgas ===
On 3 August 2012, he signed a 2-year contract with Chernomorets Burgas for free. On 13 December, he was arrested for illegal betting. Three days later he was released from the club. However, he did not face any legal charges.

=== PFC Montana ===
In February 2013, Montana acquired the services of Mladenov until the end of the 2012/13 A PFG season. At the end of season, his contract had expired.

=== Marek Dupnitsa ===
On 2 June 2013, Mladenov played one match for Marek Dupnitsa in the amateur V Group against Slivnishki geroi and scored a goal.

=== Cherno More Varna ===
On 5 June 2013, he was signed by Cherno More.

=== International career ===
Mladenov earned his first cap for Bulgaria on 7 September 2019, coming on as a late second-half substitute for Galin Ivanov in the 0:4 away loss against England in a UEFA Euro 2020 qualifier.

== Career statistics ==
Updated 30 May 2012.

Club	Season	League		Cup		Europe		Other		Total	
Club	Season	Apps	Goals	Apps	Goals	Apps	Goals	Apps	Goals	Apps	Goals
Levski Sofia	2010–11	28	5	2	0	12	5	—		42	10
Levski Sofia	2011–12	16	2	1	0	2	0	—		19	2
Chernomorets	2012–13	6	0	1	0	—		—		7	0
Montana	2012–13	15	2	0	0	—		—		15	2
Marek Dupnitsa	2012–13	1	1	0	0	—		—		1	1
Cherno More	2013–14	9	1	3	0	—		—		12	1
Marek Dupnitsa	2013–14	4	0	0	0	—		—		4	0
Trikala	2014–15	10	5	0	0	—		—		10	5
Oborishte	2014–15	16	16	0	0	—		—		16	16
Marek Dupnitsa	2015–16	16	6	1	0	—		—		17	6
Pirin Blagoevgrad	2015–16	8	1	0	0	—		—		8	1
Pirin Blagoevgrad	2016–17	26	11	3	2	—		—		29	13
Pirin Blagoevgrad	2017–18	5	0	0	0	—		—		5	0
Etar	2017–18	10	1	0	0	—		4 (Note: Relegation Play-offs)	1	14	2
Etar	2018–19	30	11	2	0	—		1 (Note: Europa League play-off)	0	33	11
Etar	2019–20	7	7	0	0	—		—		7	7
Career totals		44	7	13	2	14	5	5	1	61	12
