= Joel Martínez (footballer, born 1988) =

Andorran footballer

Personal information
- Full name: Francisc Joel Martínez Vilar
- Date of birth: 31 December 1988 (age 37)
- Place of birth: Andorra
- Position: Midfielder

Team information
- Current team: Inter d'Escaldes (Head of Football School)

Senior career*
Years	Team	Apps	(Gls)
2005–2006	UE Sant Julià		
2006	FC Andorra	3	(0)
2007–2008	UE Sant Julià		
2008–2013	FC Andorra	126	(12)
2013–2014	UE Sant Julià	5	(0)
2014–2017	FC Santa Coloma	68	(6)
2017	Inter d'Escaldes	6	(1)
2018–2019	FC Andorra	17	(0)
2019–2020	FC Ordino	26	(1)

International career
2007	Andorra	1	(0)

Managerial career
- Inter d'Escaldes (youth coach)
- * Club domestic league appearances and goals as of 18:09, 27 August 2020 (UTC)

Francisc Joel Martínez Vilar (born 31 December 1988) is a retired Andorran footballer who played as a midfielder and current Head of Football School at Inter d'Escaldes.

== Club career ==
Martínez's senior career began with UE Sant Julià in 2005, remaining with the Primera Divisió team until 2006 when the midfielder agreed to join Andorran-based Spanish Tercera Catalana side FC Andorra. Martínez spent the 2007–08 Primera Divisió season back with Sant Julià, prior to returning to Spain with FC Andorra for the following campaign. This spell with the club lasted five years, with Martínez netting twelve goals in one hundred and twenty-six appearances. He rejoined Sant Julià for a third time in 2013, subsequently winning the Copa Constitució in his sole season there. Martínez spent the next three years with FC Santa Coloma.

After winning the league title in every season with FC Santa Coloma, Martínez was signed by fellow top-flight team Inter d'Escaldes in 2017. Six matches and one goal followed. Martínez returned to FC Andorra in 2018, with the club now in Primera Catalana. In mid-2019, Martínez returned to Andorra with FC Ordino. He appeared fifteen times in 2019–20 as they suffered relegation.

While still an active player for FC Ordino, in June 2019, Inter d'Escaldes confirmed that Martínez, who had previously also been a youth coach at the club, had been hired as coordinator of the club's football school. As of June 2024, Martínez still held this role.

== International career ==
Martínez was called up by Andorra in 2007. He made his debut on 28 March during a UEFA Euro 2008 qualifier with England, with his nation losing 0–3 at the Estadi Olímpic Lluís Companys; he was subbed on for Manolo Jiménez Soria after sixty-nine minutes.

== Career statistics ==
As of 27 August 2020.

Club statistics
Club	Season	League			Cup		League Cup		Continental		Other		Total	
Club	Season	Division	Apps	Goals	Apps	Goals	Apps	Goals	Apps	Goals	Apps	Goals	Apps	Goals
FC Andorra	2008–09	Tercera Catalana	31	2	0	0	—		—		0	0	31	2
FC Andorra	2009–10	Tercera Catalana	31	5	0	0	—		—		0	0	31	5
FC Andorra	2010–11	Tercera Catalana	24	3	0	0	—		—		0	0	24	3
FC Andorra	2011–12	Segona Catalana	32	2	0	0	—		—		0	0	32	2
FC Andorra	2012–13	Primera Catalana	8	0	0	0	—		—		0	0	8	0
FC Andorra	Total		126	12	0	0	—		—		0	0	126	12
FC Santa Coloma	2014–15	Primera Divisió	19	4	0	0	—		0	0	0	0	19	4
Inter d'Escaldes	2017–18	Primera Divisió	6	1	0	0	—		—		0	0	6	1
FC Ordino	2019–20	Primera Divisió	15	0	0	0	—		—		0	0	15	0
Career total			166	17	0	0	—		0	0	0	0	166	17

== Honours ==
UE Sant Julià

- Copa Constitució: 2014

FC Santa Coloma

- Primera Divisió (3): 2014–15, 2015–16, 2016–17
