= 2022–23 Primera Divisió =

Primera Divisió
- Season: 2022–23
- Dates: 11 September 2022 – 21 May 2023
- Champions: Atlètic Club d'Escaldes; 1st title
- Relegated: Engordany; Sant Julia
- Champions League: Atlètic Club d'Escaldes
- Europa Conference League: Inter Club d'Escaldes; FC Santa Coloma
- Matches: 112
- Goals: 341 (3.04 per match)
- Top goalscorer: Faysal Chouaib (19 goals)
- Biggest home win: Inter Club d'Escaldes 12–0 Sant Julià (27 November 2022)
- Biggest away win: Sant Julià 0–6 Inter Club d'Escaldes (29 January 2023)
- Highest scoring: Inter Club d'Escaldes 12–0 Sant Julià (27 November 2022)
- Longest winning run: 6 matches Inter Club d'Escaldes
- Longest unbeaten run: 15 matches Atlètic Club d'Escaldes
- Longest winless run: 11 matches Ordino
- Longest losing run: 9 matches Sant Julià
- All statistics correct as of 28 May 2023.

The 2022–23 Primera Divisió was the 28th season of top-tier football in Andorra. The season began on 11 September 2022. The league champion qualified to compete in the 2023–24 UEFA Champions League.

== Participating teams ==
Locations of the 2022–23 Primera Divisió teams

Club	Location
Atlètic Club d'Escaldes	Escaldes-Engordany
Engordany	Escaldes-Engordany
Inter Club d'Escaldes	Escaldes-Engordany
Ordino	Ordino
Penya Encarnada	Andorra la Vella
Sant Julià	Sant Julià de Lòria
FC Santa Coloma	Santa Coloma
UE Santa Coloma	Santa Coloma

== Standings ==
=== League table ===
Pos	Team	Pld	W	D	L	GF	GA	GD	Pts	Qualification
1	Atlètic Club d'Escaldes (C)	28	19	6	3	68	19	+49	63	Qualification for the Champions League preliminary round
2	Inter Club d'Escaldes	28	18	7	3	76	23	+53	61	Qualification for the Europa Conference League first qualifying round
3	FC Santa Coloma	28	15	8	5	55	19	+36	53	Qualification for the Europa Conference League first qualifying round
4	UE Santa Coloma	28	10	12	6	40	29	+11	42	
5	Penya Encarnada	28	6	9	13	25	46	−21	27	
6	Ordino	28	5	8	15	33	55	−22	23	
7	Engordany (R)	28	6	4	18	21	67	−46	22	Qualification for the relegation play-offs
8	Sant Julià (R)	28	4	4	20	23	83	−60	16	Relegation to the 2023–24 Segona Divisió

Rules for classification: 1) Points; 2) Head-to-head points; 3) Head-to-head goal difference; 4) Head-to-head goals scored; 5) Goal difference; 6) Goals scored.
(C) Champions; (R) Relegated

== Results ==
=== Fixtures and results ===
The eight clubs played each other four times for a total of twenty-eight matches season.

Home \ Away	ACE	ENG	INT	ORD	PEN	SJU	SFC	SUE	ACE	ENG	INT	ORD	PEN	SJU	SFC	SUE
Atlètic Club d'Escaldes		1–0	2–1	1–1	3–0	5–1	0–0	0–2		2–0	1–2	6–1	4–0	2–0	1–0	3–1
Engordany	0–3		0–3	0–3	1–0	2–1	0–1	1–1	1–7		0–4	1–2	1–0	4–0	0–3	1–2
Inter Club d'Escaldes	2–1	2–0		2–1	2–0	1–1	2–1	1–3	2–2	3–0		0–1	1–0	12–0	0–0	1–0
Ordino	0–3	5–3	0–3		1–1	0–1	1–4	1–3	1–1	1–2	3–5		0–3	2–3	0–1	1–1
Penya Encarnada	0–1	1–1	2–2	1–0		1–1	0–2	1–1	0–3	0–0	0–8	1–1		3–2	2–0	0–2
Sant Julià	0–3	0–2	0–6	3–2	0–0		1–2	0–3	1–6	3–0	0–5	1–2	1–2		0–3	1–3
FC Santa Coloma	1–1	6–0	2–2	1–1	3–2	4–0		0–1	0–3	7–0	1–1	3–1	3–0	4–0		3–0
UE Santa Coloma	2–3	1–1	2–2	0–0	1–1	3–1	0–0		0–0	5–0	0–1	1–1	1–4	1–1	0–0	

Legend: Blue = home team win; Yellow = draw; Red = away team win.

== Primera Divisió play-offs ==
The seventh-placed team, and the third-placed in the relegation round, from the Primera Divisió Engordany and the runners-up from the Segona Divisió, Carroi, played a play-off over two legs for a place in the 2023–24 Primera Divisió.

All times are in Central European Summer Time (UTC+2:00).

27 May 2023
20:30

Carroi	2–0	Engordany
García 4'; Cinco 55'	Report

Camp de Futbol La Massana, La Massana
31 May 2023
20:30

Engordany	0–2 (0–4 Agg.)	Carroi
		Bravo 63', 70'

Centre d'Entrenament de la FAF 1, Escaldes–Engordany

== Statistics ==
=== Scorers ===
As of 28 May 2023

Rank	Player	Club	Goals
1	(Spain) Faysal Chouaib	UE Santa Coloma	19
2	(France) Guillaume Lopez	Atlètic Club d'Escaldes	15
3	(Portugal) Rodrigo Piloto	Penya Encarnada	12
4	(Spain) Eloy Gila	FC Santa Coloma	11
4	(Spain) Gerard Artigas	Inter Club d'Escaldes	11
5	(Venezuela) Christian Novoa	FC Santa Coloma	9
6	(Morocco) Domi Berlanga	Inter Club d'Escaldes	8
7	(Spain) Jorge Bolívar	Atlètic Club d'Escaldes	7
8	(Spain) Martí Riverola	Atlètic Club d'Escaldes	6
8	(Spain) Carles Coto	FC Santa Coloma	6
8	(Spain) Aridai Cabrera	Inter Club d'Escaldes	6
9	(Spain) Víctor Casadesús	Atlètic Club d'Escaldes	5
9	(Spain) Adrià Gallego	Inter Club d'Escaldes	5
9	(Spain) Ángel Pérez	Inter Club d'Escaldes	5
9	(Spain) Alberto Rabassó	Ordino	5
10	(Andorra) Álex Martínez	Atlètic Club d'Escaldes	4
10	(Spain) Carlos Sagüés	Atlètic Club d'Escaldes	4
10	(Spain) Xavi Puerto	Atlètic Club d'Escaldes	4
10	(Spain) Mario Mourelo	FC Santa Coloma	4
10	(Spain) David Corominas	Ordino	4
10	(Spain) Izan Moya	Ordino	4
10	(Portugal) Fábio Martins	Penya Encarnada	4
10	(Portugal) Gonçalo Paulino	UE Santa Coloma	4
11	(Spain) Aleix Cisteró	Atlètic Club d'Escaldes	3
11	(Spain) Víctor Pérez	Atlètic Club d'Escaldes	3
11	(Spain) Kilian Grant	FC Santa Coloma	3
11	(Spain) Miguel López	FC Santa Coloma	3
11	(Spain) David Virgili	FC Santa Coloma	3
11	(Portugal) João Teixeira	FC Ordino	3
11	(Spain) Marc Caballé	Inter Club d'Escaldes	3
11	(Spain) Chete González	Inter Club d'Escaldes	3
11	(Spain) Íñigo Sánchez	Inter Club d'Escaldes	3
11	(France) Celyan Djattit	Sant Julià	3
11	(Mexico) Alejandro Huerta	Sant Julià	3
11	(Spain) Chechu Meneses	Sant Julià	3
11	(Spain) Marc Pérez	Sant Julià	3
11	(Andorra) Víctor Bernat	UE Engordany	3
11	(Argentina) Julián Fernández	UE Engordany	3
11	(Uruguay) Marcelo Tabárez	UE Engordany	3
11	(Spain) Cristian Del Pozo	UE Santa Coloma	3
11	(Andorra) Christian García	UE Santa Coloma	3
11	(Morocco) Monsif Khttar	UE Santa Coloma	3
11	(Portugal) Tiago Portuga	UE Santa Coloma	3
11	(Venezuela) Iván Quintero	UE Santa Coloma	3
12	(Spain) Víctor Alonso	Atlètic Club d'Escaldes	2
12	(Spain) Julen Bernaola	Atlètic Club d'Escaldes	2
12	(Spain) David Rodríguez	Atlètic Club d'Escaldes	2
12	(Spain) Agustín Filosa	FC Ordino	2
12	(Andorra) Brian Pubill	FC Ordino	2
12	(Spain) Júnior Vicente	FC Ordino	2
12	(Venezuela) Octavio Páez	FC Santa Coloma	2
12	(Spain) Daniel Toribio	FC Santa Coloma	2
12	(Romania) Raul Feher	Inter Club d'Escaldes	2
12	(Spain) Jordi Roca	Inter Club d'Escaldes	2
12	(Spain) Álex Briega	Penya Encarnada	2
12	(Spain) Álex Poves	Penya Encarnada	2
12	(Portugal) João Tomaz	Penya Encarnada	2
12	(Spain) Nene	Sant Julià	2
12	(Spain) César Rodríguez	Sant Julià	2
12	(Hungary) Zsolt Szilvási	Sant Julià	2
12	(Andorra) Eric Balastegui	UE Engordany	2
12	(Andorra) Sebastián Gómez	UE Engordany	2
12	(Mexico) Diego Nájera	UE Engordany	2
12	(Andorra) Marc Pujol	UE Engordany	2
12	(Portugal) Gabi	UE Santa Coloma	2
12	(Equatorial Guinea) Jordan Gutiérrez	UE Santa Coloma	2
13	(France) Sébastien Aguero	Atlètic Club d'Escaldes	1
13	(Spain) Javi Morales	Atlètic Club d'Escaldes	1
13	(Spain) Andoni	FC Ordino	1
13	(Spain) Sergi Caballero	FC Ordino	1
13	(Colombia) Johnatan Estrada	FC Ordino	1
13	(Colombia) Julián Martínez	FC Ordino	1
13	(Andorra) Jordi Aláez	FC Santa Coloma	1
13	(Spain) Gerard Gómez	FC Santa Coloma	1
13	(Spain) Miguel Ángel	FC Santa Coloma	1
13	(Andorra) Marc Rebés	FC Santa Coloma	1
13	(Belarus) Maksim Valadzko	FC Santa Coloma	1
13	(Spain) Pau Bosch	Inter Club d'Escaldes	1
13	(Spain) Iván de Nova	Inter Club d'Escaldes	1
13	(Spain) Roger Marcè	Inter Club d'Escaldes	1
13	(Spain) Gerardo Rubio	Inter Club d'Escaldes	1
13	(Spain) Coke Pastor	Penya Encarnada d'Andorra	1
13	(Spain) Peter	Penya Encarnada d'Andorra	1
13	(Argentina) Matías Vaamonde	Penya Encarnada d'Andorra	1
13	(France) Yves Zama	Penya Encarnada d'Andorra	1
13	(Peru) Juan Gutiérrez	Sant Julià	1
13	(Spain) Pedro Santos	Sant Julià	1
13	(South Korea) Seung-cheol Jang	Sant Julià	1
13	(Andorra) Lluís Blanco	Sant Julià	1
13	(Brazil) Douglas Abner	UE Santa Coloma	1
13	(Spain) Checa	UE Santa Coloma	1
13	(Argentina) Tino Mendoza	UE Santa Coloma	1
13	(Brazil) Moicano	UE Santa Coloma	1

== Own Goals ==
Player	Club	Against
(Argentina) Matías Basterrechea	Penya Encarnada d'Andorra	vs Atlètic Club d'Escaldes
(France) Lilian de Palmas	Penya Encarnada d'Andorra	vs Atlètic Club d'Escaldes
(Spain) Xavi Carmona	UE Engordany	vs Atlètic Club d'Escaldes
