= 2018 FIFA World Cup qualification – UEFA Group B =

Football qualification

The 2018 FIFA World Cup qualification UEFA Group B was one of the nine UEFA groups for 2018 FIFA World Cup qualification. The group consisted of six teams: Portugal, Switzerland, Hungary, Faroe Islands, Latvia, and Andorra.

The draw for the first round (group stage) was held as part of the 2018 FIFA World Cup Preliminary Draw on 25 July 2015, starting 18:00 MSK (UTC+3), at the Konstantinovsky Palace in Strelna, Saint Petersburg, Russia.

The group winners, Portugal, qualified directly for the 2018 FIFA World Cup. The group runners-up, Switzerland, advanced to the play-offs as one of the best eight runners-up.

== Standings ==
2018 FIFA World Cup qualification tiebreakers
In league format, the ranking of teams in each group was based on the following criteria (regulations Articles 20.6 and 20.7):
1. Points (3 points for a win, 1 point for a draw, 0 points for a loss)
2. Overall goal difference
3. Overall goals scored
4. Points in matches between tied teams
5. Goal difference in matches between tied teams
6. Goals scored in matches between tied teams
7. Away goals scored in matches between tied teams (if the tie was only between two teams in home-and-away league format)
8. Fair play points
  - first yellow card: minus 1 point
  - indirect red card (second yellow card): minus 3 points
  - direct red card: minus 4 points
  - yellow card and direct red card: minus 5 points
9. Drawing of lots by the FIFA Organising Committee

Pos	Team	Pld	W	D	L	GF	GA	GD	Pts	Qualification	Portugal	Switzerland	Hungary	Faroe Islands	Latvia	Andorra
1	Portugal	10	9	0	1	32	4	+28	27	Qualification to 2018 FIFA World Cup	—	2–0	3–0	5–1	4–1	6–0
2	Switzerland	10	9	0	1	23	7	+16	27	Advance to second round	2–0	—	5–2	2–0	1–0	3–0
3	Hungary	10	4	1	5	14	14	0	13		0–1	2–3	—	1–0	3–1	4–0
4	Faroe Islands	10	2	3	5	4	16	−12	9		0–6	0–2	0–0	—	0–0	1–0
5	Latvia	10	2	1	7	7	18	−11	7		0–3	0–3	0–2	0–2	—	4–0
6	Andorra	10	1	1	8	2	23	−21	4		0–2	1–2	1–0	0–0	0–1	—

Source: FIFA
Rules for classification: Qualification tiebreakers

== Matches ==
The fixture list was confirmed by UEFA on 26 July 2015, the day following the draw. Times are CET/CEST, (Note: CET (UTC+1) for matches on 13 November 2016 and 25 March 2017, and CEST (UTC+2) for all other matches.) as listed by UEFA (local times are in parentheses).

6 September 2016
20:45
(20:45 UTC+2)

Andorra	0–1	Latvia
	Report (FIFA); Report (UEFA)	Šabala 48'

Estadi Nacional, Andorra la Vella
Attendance: 1,115
Referee: Clayton Pisani (Malta)
6 September 2016
20:45
(19:45 UTC+1)

Faroe Islands	0–0	Hungary
	Report (FIFA); Report (UEFA)

Tórsvøllur, Tórshavn
Attendance: 4,066
Referee: Slavko Vinčić (Slovenia)
6 September 2016
20:45
(20:45 UTC+2)

Switzerland	2–0	Portugal
Embolo 24'; Mehmedi 30'	Report (FIFA); Report (UEFA)

St. Jakob-Park, Basel
Attendance: 36,000
Referee: Antonio Mateu Lahoz (Spain)

7 October 2016
20:45
(20:45 UTC+2)

Hungary	2–3	Switzerland
Szalai 53', 71'	Report (FIFA); Report (UEFA)	Seferovic 51'; Rodriguez 67'; Stocker 89'

Groupama Arena, Budapest
Attendance: 21,668
Referee: Björn Kuipers (Netherlands)
7 October 2016
20:45
(21:45 UTC+3)

Latvia	0–2	Faroe Islands
	Report (FIFA); Report (UEFA)	Nattestad 19'; Edmundsson 70'

Skonto Stadium, Riga
Attendance: 4,823
Referee: Serhiy Boyko (Ukraine)
7 October 2016
20:45
(19:45 UTC+1)

Portugal	6–0	Andorra
Ronaldo 2', 4', 47', 68'; Cancelo 44'; A. Silva 86'	Report (FIFA); Report (UEFA)

Estádio Municipal, Aveiro
Attendance: 25,120
Referee: Oliver Drachta (Austria)

10 October 2016
20:45
(20:45 UTC+2)

Andorra	1–2	Switzerland
A. Martínez 90+1'	Report (FIFA); Report (UEFA)	Schär 19' (pen.); Mehmedi 77'

Estadi Nacional, Andorra la Vella
Attendance: 2,014
Referee: John Beaton (Scotland)
10 October 2016
20:45
(19:45 UTC+1)

Faroe Islands	0–6	Portugal
	Report (FIFA); Report (UEFA)	A. Silva 12', 22', 37'; Ronaldo 65'; Moutinho 90+1'; Cancelo 90+3'

Tórsvøllur, Tórshavn
Attendance: 4,780
Referee: Gediminas Mažeika (Lithuania)
10 October 2016
20:45
(21:45 UTC+3)

Latvia	0–2	Hungary
	Report (FIFA); Report (UEFA)	Gyurcsó 10'; Szalai 77'

Skonto Stadium, Riga
Attendance: 4,715
Referee: Paweł Gil (Poland)

13 November 2016
18:00
(18:00 UTC+1)

Hungary	4–0	Andorra
Gera 34'; Lang 43'; Gyurcsó 73'; Szalai 88'	Report (FIFA); Report (UEFA)

Groupama Arena, Budapest
Attendance: 20,479
Referee: Christos Nicolaides (Cyprus)
13 November 2016
18:00
(18:00 UTC+1)

Switzerland	2–0	Faroe Islands
Derdiyok 27'; Lichtsteiner 83'	Report (FIFA); Report (UEFA)

Swissporarena, Lucerne
Attendance: 14,800
Referee: Sébastien Delferière (Belgium)
13 November 2016
20:45
(19:45 UTC±0)

Portugal	4–1	Latvia
Ronaldo 28' (pen.), 85'; Carvalho 70'; Alves 90+2'	Report (FIFA); Report (UEFA)	Zjuzins 67'

Estádio Algarve, Faro/Loulé
Attendance: 20,744
Referee: Bobby Madden (Scotland)

25 March 2017
18:00
(18:00 UTC+1)

Andorra	0–0	Faroe Islands
	Report (FIFA); Report (UEFA)

Estadi Nacional, Andorra la Vella
Attendance: 1,755
Referee: Ognjen Valjić (Bosnia and Herzegovina)
25 March 2017
18:00
(18:00 UTC+1)

Switzerland	1–0	Latvia
Drmić 66'	Report (FIFA); Report (UEFA)

Stade de Genève, Geneva
Attendance: 25,000
Referee: Vladislav Bezborodov (Russia)
25 March 2017
20:45
(19:45 UTC±0)

Portugal	3–0	Hungary
A. Silva 32'; Ronaldo 36', 65'	Report (FIFA); Report (UEFA)

Estádio da Luz, Lisbon
Attendance: 57,816
Referee: Szymon Marciniak (Poland)

9 June 2017
20:45
(20:45 UTC+2)

Andorra	1–0	Hungary
Rebés 26'	Report (FIFA); Report (UEFA)

Estadi Nacional, Andorra la Vella
Attendance: 2,407
Referee: Charalambos Kalogeropoulos (Greece)
9 June 2017
20:45
(19:45 UTC+1)

Faroe Islands	0–2	Switzerland
	Report (FIFA); Report (UEFA)	Xhaka 36'; Shaqiri 59'

Tórsvøllur, Tórshavn
Attendance: 4,594
Referee: Luca Banti (Italy)
9 June 2017
20:45
(21:45 UTC+3)

Latvia	0–3	Portugal
	Report (FIFA); Report (UEFA)	Ronaldo 41', 63'; A. Silva 67'

Skonto Stadium, Riga
Attendance: 8,087
Referee: István Kovács (Romania)

31 August 2017
20:45
(20:45 UTC+2)

Hungary	3–1	Latvia
Kádár 6'; Szalai 26'; Dzsudzsák 68'	Report (FIFA); Report (UEFA)	Freimanis 40'

Groupama Arena, Budapest
Attendance: 16,500
Referee: Yevhen Aranovsky (Ukraine)
31 August 2017
20:45
(19:45 UTC+1)

Portugal	5–1	Faroe Islands
Ronaldo 3', 28' (pen.), 65'; Carvalho 58'; Oliveira 85'	Report (FIFA); Report (UEFA)	Baldvinsson 38'

Estádio do Bessa, Porto
Attendance: 26,514
Referee: Srđan Jovanović (Serbia)
31 August 2017
20:45
(20:45 UTC+2)

Switzerland	3–0	Andorra
Seferovic 43', 63'; Lichtsteiner 67'	Report (FIFA); Report (UEFA)

Kybunpark, St. Gallen
Attendance: 13,600
Referee: Tore Hansen (Norway)

3 September 2017
18:00
(17:00 UTC+1)

Faroe Islands	1–0	Andorra
Rólantsson 32'	Report (FIFA); Report (UEFA)

Tórsvøllur, Tórshavn
Attendance: 4,357
Referee: Alan Mario Sant (Malta)
3 September 2017
20:45
(20:45 UTC+2)

Hungary	0–1	Portugal
	Report (FIFA); Report (UEFA)	A. Silva 48'

Groupama Arena, Budapest
Attendance: 21,800
Referee: Danny Makkelie (Netherlands)
3 September 2017
20:45
(21:45 UTC+3)

Latvia	0–3	Switzerland
	Report (FIFA); Report (UEFA)	Seferovic 9'; Džemaili 54'; Rodriguez 58' (pen.)

Skonto Stadium, Riga
Attendance: 7,587
Referee: Serdar Gözübüyük (Netherlands)

7 October 2017
18:00
(17:00 UTC+1)

Faroe Islands	0–0	Latvia
	Report (FIFA); Report (UEFA)

Tórsvøllur, Tórshavn
Attendance: 4,203
Referee: Robert Schörgenhofer (Austria)
7 October 2017
20:45
(20:45 UTC+2)

Andorra	0–2	Portugal
	Report (FIFA); Report (UEFA)	Ronaldo 63'; A. Silva 86'

Estadi Nacional, Andorra la Vella
Attendance: 3,193
Referee: Miroslav Zelinka (Czech Republic)
7 October 2017
20:45
(20:45 UTC+2)

Switzerland	5–2	Hungary
Xhaka 18'; Frei 20'; Zuber 43', 49'; Lichtsteiner 83'	Report (FIFA); Report (UEFA)	Guzmics 59'; Ugrai 89'

St. Jakob-Park, Basel
Attendance: 32,018
Referee: Paolo Tagliavento (Italy)

10 October 2017
20:45
(20:45 UTC+2)

Hungary	1–0	Faroe Islands
Böde 81'	Report (FIFA); Report (UEFA)

Groupama Arena, Budapest
Attendance: 21,400
Referee: Roi Reinshreiber (Israel)
10 October 2017
20:45
(21:45 UTC+3)

Latvia	4–0	Andorra
Ikaunieks 11'; Šabala 19', 59'; Tarasovs 63'	Report (FIFA); Report (UEFA)

Skonto Stadium, Riga
Attendance: 4,153
Referee: Mads-Kristoffer Kristoffersen (Denmark)
10 October 2017
20:45
(19:45 UTC+1)

Portugal	2–0	Switzerland
Djourou 41' (o.g.); A. Silva 57'	Report (FIFA); Report (UEFA)

Estádio da Luz, Lisbon
Attendance: 61,566
Referee: Cüneyt Çakır (Turkey)

== Goalscorers ==
There were 82 goals scored in 30 matches, for an average of 2.73 goals per match.

15 goals

- (Portugal) Cristiano Ronaldo

9 goals

- (Portugal) André Silva

5 goals

- (Hungary) Ádám Szalai

4 goals

- (Switzerland) Haris Seferovic

3 goals

- (Latvia) Valērijs Šabala
- (Switzerland) Stephan Lichtsteiner

2 goals

- (Hungary) Ádám Gyurcsó
- (Portugal) João Cancelo
- (Portugal) William Carvalho
- (Switzerland) Admir Mehmedi
- (Switzerland) Ricardo Rodriguez
- (Switzerland) Granit Xhaka
- (Switzerland) Steven Zuber

1 goal

- (Andorra) Alexandre Martínez
- (Andorra) Marc Rebés
- (Faroe Islands) Rógvi Baldvinsson
- (Faroe Islands) Jóan Símun Edmundsson
- (Faroe Islands) Sonni Nattestad
- (Faroe Islands) Gilli Rólantsson
- (Hungary) Dániel Böde
- (Hungary) Balázs Dzsudzsák
- (Hungary) Zoltán Gera
- (Hungary) Richárd Guzmics
- (Hungary) Tamás Kádár
- (Hungary) Ádám Lang
- (Hungary) Roland Ugrai
- (Latvia) Gints Freimanis
- (Latvia) Dāvis Ikaunieks
- (Latvia) Igors Tarasovs
- (Latvia) Artūrs Zjuzins
- (Portugal) Bruno Alves
- (Portugal) João Moutinho
- (Portugal) Nélson Oliveira
- (Switzerland) Eren Derdiyok
- (Switzerland) Josip Drmić
- (Switzerland) Blerim Džemaili
- (Switzerland) Breel Embolo
- (Switzerland) Fabian Frei
- (Switzerland) Fabian Schär
- (Switzerland) Xherdan Shaqiri
- (Switzerland) Valentin Stocker

1 own goal

- (Switzerland) Johan Djourou (playing against Portugal)

== Discipline ==
A player was automatically suspended for the next match for the following offences:

- Receiving a red card (red card suspensions could be extended for serious offences)
- Receiving two yellow cards in two different matches (yellow card suspensions were carried forward to the play-offs, but not the finals or any other future international matches)

The following suspensions were served during the qualifying matches:

Player	Team	Offence(s)	Suspended for match(es)
Granit Xhaka	Switzerland	(yellow card) (yellow-red card) vs Portugal (6 September 2016)	vs Hungary (7 October 2016)
Marc Rebés	Andorra	(red card) vs Portugal (7 October 2016)	vs Switzerland (10 October 2016) vs Hungary (13 November 2016)
Jordi Rubio	Andorra	(yellow card) (yellow-red card) vs Portugal (7 October 2016)	vs Switzerland (10 October 2016)
Valon Behrami	Switzerland	(yellow card) vs Portugal (6 September 2016); (yellow card) vs Hungary (7 October 2016)	vs Andorra (10 October 2016)
Ildefons Lima	Andorra	(yellow card) vs Portugal (7 October 2016); (yellow card) vs Switzerland (10 October 2016)	vs Hungary (13 November 2016)
Tamás Kádár	Hungary	(yellow card) vs Faroe Islands (6 September 2016); (yellow card) vs Latvia (10 October 2016)	vs Andorra (13 November 2016)
Valērijs Šabala	Latvia	(yellow card) vs Andorra (6 September 2016); (yellow card) vs Hungary (10 October 2016)	vs Portugal (13 November 2016)
Pepe	Portugal	(yellow card) vs Andorra (7 October 2016); (yellow card) vs Faroe Islands (10 October 2016)	vs Latvia (13 November 2016)
Fróði Benjaminsen	Faroe Islands	(yellow card) vs Hungary (6 September 2016); (yellow card) vs Switzerland (13 November 2016)	vs Andorra (25 March 2017)
László Kleinheisler	Hungary	(yellow card) vs Faroe Islands (6 September 2016); (yellow card) vs Andorra (13 November 2016)	vs Portugal (25 March 2017)
Vitālijs Maksimenko	Latvia	(yellow card) vs Faroe Islands (7 October 2016); (yellow card) vs Portugal (13 November 2016)	vs Switzerland (25 March 2017)
Marc García	Andorra	(yellow card) vs Latvia (6 September 2016); (yellow card) vs Faroe Islands (25 March 2017)	vs Hungary (9 June 2017)
Jordi Rubio	Andorra	(yellow card) vs Portugal (7 October 2016); (yellow card) vs Faroe Islands (25 March 2017)	vs Hungary (9 June 2017)
Márcio Vieira	Andorra	(yellow card) vs Latvia (6 September 2016); (yellow card) vs Faroe Islands (25 March 2017)	vs Hungary (9 June 2017)
Jóan Símun Edmundsson	Faroe Islands	(yellow card) (yellow-red card) vs Andorra (25 March 2017)	vs Switzerland (9 June 2017)
Fabian Schär	Switzerland	(yellow card) vs Andorra (10 October 2016); (yellow card) vs Latvia (25 March 2017)	vs Faroe Islands (9 June 2017)
Chus Rubio	Andorra	(yellow card) vs Switzerland (10 October 2016); (yellow card) vs Hungary (9 June 2017)	vs Switzerland (31 August 2017)
Moisés San Nicolás	Andorra	(yellow card) vs Faroe Islands (25 March 2017); (yellow card) vs Hungary (9 June 2017)	vs Switzerland (31 August 2017)
Gļebs Kļuškins	Latvia	(yellow card) vs Portugal (13 November 2016); (yellow card) vs Portugal (9 June 2017)	vs Hungary (31 August 2017)
Oļegs Laizāns	Latvia	(yellow card) vs Andorra (6 September 2016); (yellow card) vs Portugal (9 June 2017)	vs Hungary (31 August 2017)
Jordi Aláez	Andorra	(yellow card) vs Hungary (9 June 2017); (yellow card) vs Switzerland (31 August 2017)	vs Faroe Islands (3 September 2017)
Ludovic Clemente	Andorra	(yellow card) vs Latvia (6 September 2016); (yellow card) vs Switzerland (31 August 2017)	vs Faroe Islands (3 September 2017)
Barnabás Bese	Hungary	(yellow card) vs Andorra (9 June 2017); (yellow card) vs Latvia (31 August 2017)	vs Portugal (3 September 2017)
Gints Freimanis	Latvia	(yellow card) vs Switzerland (25 March 2017); (yellow card) vs Hungary (31 August 2017)	vs Switzerland (3 September 2017)
Marc Pujol	Andorra	(yellow card) vs Hungary (9 June 2017); (yellow card) vs Faroe Islands (3 September 2017)	vs Portugal (7 October 2017)
Balázs Dzsudzsák	Hungary	(yellow card) vs Portugal (25 March 2017); (yellow card) vs Portugal (3 September 2017)	vs Switzerland (7 October 2017)
Attila Fiola	Hungary	(yellow card) vs Faroe Islands (6 September 2016); (yellow card) vs Portugal (3 September 2017)	vs Switzerland (7 October 2017)
Tamás Priskin	Hungary	(red card) vs Portugal (3 September 2017)	vs Switzerland (7 October 2017)
Dāvis Indrāns	Latvia	(yellow card) vs Hungary (31 August 2017); (yellow card) vs Switzerland (3 September 2017)	vs Faroe Islands (7 October 2017)
Aleksandrs Solovjovs	Latvia	(yellow card) vs Hungary (31 August 2017); (yellow card) vs Switzerland (3 September 2017)	vs Faroe Islands (7 October 2017)
Víctor Rodríguez	Andorra	(yellow card) vs Portugal (7 October 2016); (yellow card) vs Portugal (7 October 2017)	vs Latvia (10 October 2017)
Moisés San Nicolás	Andorra	(yellow card) vs Faroe Islands (3 September 2017); (yellow card) vs Portugal (7 October 2017)	vs Latvia (10 October 2017)
Ákos Elek	Hungary	(yellow card) vs Portugal (3 September 2017); (yellow card) vs Switzerland (7 October 2017)	vs Faroe Islands (10 October 2017)
Kaspars Gorkšs	Latvia	(yellow card) vs Portugal (13 November 2016); (yellow card) vs Faroe Islands (7 October 2017)	vs Andorra (10 October 2017)
