= 2006 Copa Constitució =

Tournament details
- Country: Andorra

Final positions
- Champions: FC Santa Coloma
- Runners-up: FC Rànger's

Copa Constitució 2006 is the fourteenth season of Andorra's football knockout tournament. The competition started on 22 January 2006 with the first round games and ended on 13 May 2006 with the Final. The defending champions are FC Santa Coloma.

== Results ==
=== First round ===
The matches were played on 22 January 2006.

Team 1	Score	Team 2
Casa Estrella del Benfica	4–1	FC Santa Coloma B
FC Lusitanos B	2–0	Sporting Escaldes
Principat B	0–3	Granvalira Encamp

=== Second round ===
The matches were played on 5 February 2006.

Team 1	Score	Team 2
Granvalira Encamp	3–4	Inter Club d'Escaldes
FC Lusitanos B	2–4	UE Extremenya
UE Engordany	2–1	Principat
Casa Estrella del Benfica	2–3	Atlètic d'Escaldes

=== Quarterfinals ===
The ties were played on 7 May 2006.

Team 1	Score	Team 2
Inter Club d'Escaldes	2–3(aet)	FC Rànger's
UE Engordany	0–5	UE Sant Julià
Atlètic d'Escaldes	0–0(6-7p)	FC Lusitanos
UE Extremenya	w/o*	FC Santa Coloma

- The tie was awarded 0-3 to FC Santa Coloma as UE Extremenya only turned up with 7 players.

=== Semifinals ===
The ties were played on 10 May 2006.

Team 1	Score	Team 2
FC Rànger's	0–0(4-2p)	FC Lusitanos
FC Santa Coloma	1–0	UE Sant Julià

=== Final ===
13 May 2006
17:00 CEST

FC Santa Coloma	1 – 1 (a.e.t.)	FC Rànger's
Leo (90+')		Àlex Pareja (61')
Penalties
Unknown	5–3	Unknown

Estadi Comunal d'Andorra la Vella
Attendance: Unknown
Referee: Unknown
