= 2016 Andorran Supercup =

2016 Supercopa Andorra
FC Santa Coloma	UE Santa Coloma
0	1
- Date: 11 September 2016
- Venue: Estadi Comunal, Andorra la Vella
- Referee: Pedro Felipe Carvalho da Costa

The 2016 Andorran Supercup was played on 11 September 2016, at Estadi Comunal in Andorra la Vella. This was the fourteenth Andorran Supercup. It was won 1–0 by UE Santa Coloma.

== Route to the final ==
FC Santa Coloma qualified by winning the 2015–16 Primera Divisió. UE Santa Coloma qualified by winning the 2016 Copa Constitució.

== Match ==
=== Details ===
11 September 2016
17:00 CET

FC Santa Coloma	0–1	UE Santa Coloma
	Report	Anton Codina 76'

Estadi Comunal, Andorra la Vella
Referee: Pedro Felipe Carvalho da Costa
