= 2001 Copa Constitució =

Tournament details
- Country: Andorra
- Teams: 15

Final positions
- Champions: FC Santa Coloma
- Runners-up: UE Sant Julià

Tournament statistics
- Matches played: 13
- Goals scored: 59 (4.54 per match)

The 2001 Copa Constitució was the 10th season of Andorra's national football knockout tournament.

== Results ==
=== First round ===
Fifteen teams entered this round, eight from 2000–01 Primera Divisió and seven from 2000–01 Segona Divisió.

| Team 1 | Score | Team 2 |
|---|---|---|
| Sporting Club d'Escaldes | 2–3 | CE Principat |
| FC Santa Coloma B | 1–2 | FC Encamp |
| Casa Do Benfica | 5–0 | FC Encamp B |
| FC Lusitanos | 1–2 | Deportiu La Massana |
| Inter d'Ecaldes | 0–1 | FC Santa Coloma |
| FC Lusitanos B | 2–1 | Sporting Club d'Escaldes B |
| Francfurt Cerni | 0–7 | FC Rànger's |

=== Quarterfinals ===
| Team 1 | Score | Team 2 |
|---|---|---|
| Casa Do Benfica | 0–8 | UE Sant Julià |
| Deportiu La Massana | 0–1 | FC Santa Coloma |
| FC Lusitanos B | 0–1 | FC Rànger's |
| CE Principat | (p)1–1 | FC Encamp |

=== Semifinals ===
The matches were played on 31 May 2001.

| Team 1 | Score | Team 2 |
|---|---|---|
| CE Principat | 1–5 | FC Santa Coloma |
| UE Sant Julià | 6–0 | FC Rànger's |

=== Final ===
The match were played on 3 June 2001.

3 June 2001

| FC Santa Coloma | 2–0 | UE Sant Julià |
