= 2009 Copa Constitució =

Tournament details
- Country: Andorra

Final positions
- Champions: FC Santa Coloma
- Runners-up: Lusitanos

Copa Constitució 2009 is the seventeenth season of Andorra's football knockout tournament. The competition started on 17 January 2009 with the first round games and will end on 24 May 2009 with the Final. The defending champions are UE Sant Julià.

The winners will earn a place in the second qualifying round of the UEFA Europa League 2009–10.

== Results ==
On 9 December 2008 Andorran Football Federation announced the First Round fixtures and dates for all remaining rounds.

=== First round ===
This round was entered by teams from 2008–09 Segona Divisió season placed second to seventh after 6 rounds played. The matches were played on 17, 18 and 19 January 2009.

Team 1	Score	Team 2
UE Extremenya	5–1	Principat B
Atlètic Club d'Escaldes	2–3	Casa Estrella del Benfica
Lusitanos B	7–1	CE Jenlai

=== Second round ===
The winners from the previous round competed in this round, as well as one remaining team from Segona Divisió, first placed FC Encamp. The teams from this year's Primera Divisió placed fifth to eighth after 7 rounds played – CE Principat, Inter Club d'Escaldes, FC Rànger's, and UE Engordany – also entered in this round. The matches were played from 20–23 January 2009.

Team 1	Score	Team 2
UE Extremenya	3–2	FC Rànger's
Casa Estrella del Benfica	0–4	Inter Club d'Escaldes
Lusitanos B	1–3	Principat
FC Encamp	4–4; 4–2 (pens)	UE Engordany

=== Quarterfinals ===
The winners from the previous round competed in this round for turkey and together with the teams from Primera Divisió placed first to fourth after 7 rounds played – FC Santa Coloma, UE Sant Julià, UE Santa Coloma, and FC Lusitanos. The first legs were played on 1 February 2009 while the second legs took place on 8 February 2009.

Team 1	Agg.	Team 2	1st leg	2nd leg
UE Extremenya	1–8	UE Santa Coloma	0–4	1–4
Inter Club d'Escaldes	0–5	FC Santa Coloma	0–2	0–3
Principat	3–2	UE Sant Julià	1–1	2–1 (aet)
FC Encamp	2–13	Lusitanos	0–5	2–8

=== Semifinals ===
The first legs were played on 10 May 2009 while the second legs took place on 17 May 2009.

Team 1	Agg.	Team 2	1st leg	2nd leg
UE Santa Coloma	1–7	FC Santa Coloma	1–5	0–2
Principat	4–7	Lusitanos	3–3	1–4

=== Final ===
23 May 2009
17:00 CEST

FC Santa Coloma	6–1	Lusitanos
Juli Sánchez 12', 36'; Beto 30', 57'; Maicon 53'; Rodrigo 93'	Report	Pedro Franco 72'

Estadi Comunal d'Aixovall, Aixovall
