= 2010 Copa Constitució =

Tournament details
- Country: Andorra

Final positions
- Champions: UE Sant Julià
- Runners-up: FC Santa Coloma

The 2010 Copa Constitució was the eighteenth season of Andorra's football knockout tournament. The competition started on 17 January 2010 with the matches of the first elimination round and ended on 16 May 2010 with the Final. UE Sant Julià won the competition for the second time in three years with a 1–0 victory in the final over defending champions FC Santa Coloma.

With the victory, UE Sant Julià earned a place in the second qualifying round of the 2010–11 UEFA Europa League, where they lost to Finnish side MYPA.

== Results ==
=== First elimination round ===
This round was entered by all teams from 2009 to 2010 Segona Divisió. The matches were played on 17 January 2010.

Team 1	Score	Team 2
CE Jenlai	5–1	Penya Encarnada d'Andorra
Lusitanos B	2–1	FC Rànger's
Atlètic Club d'Escaldes	1–3	Casa Estrella del Benfica
Principat B	1–9	UE Extremenya

=== Second elimination round ===
The teams from 2009–10 Primera Divisió placed fifth to eighth after 7 rounds played – FC Encamp, UE Engordany, Inter Club d'Escaldes, and FC Lusitanos – enter in this round and will join the winners of the first elimination round. For each match, one Segona Divisió and one Primera Divisió team have been drawn together. The matches will be played on 24 January 2010.

Team 1	Score	Team 2
CE Jenlai	1–2	UE Engordany
Lusitanos B	0–4	Lusitanos
Casa Estrella del Benfica	0–2	Inter Club d'Escaldes
UE Extremenya	2–1	FC Encamp

=== Third elimination round ===
The winners from the previous round will compete in this round together with the teams from Primera Divisió placed first to fourth after 7 rounds played – FC Santa Coloma, UE Sant Julià, UE Santa Coloma, and CE Principat. The first legs will be played on 11 April 2010 while the second legs took place on 18 April 2010.

Team 1	Agg.	Team 2	1st leg	2nd leg
UE Engordany	0–13	UE Sant Julià	0–5	0–8
Lusitanos	7–1	FC Santa Coloma	6–0	1–1
Inter Club d'Escaldes	3–4	UE Santa Coloma	3–0	0–4
UE Extremenya	0–5	Principat	0–2	0–3

=== Semifinals ===
The first legs will be played on 25 April 2010 while the second legs took place on 9 May 2010.

Team 1	Agg.	Team 2	1st leg	2nd leg
UE Sant Julià	3–0	Lusitanos	1–0	2–0
UE Santa Coloma	5–4	Principat	3–1	2–3

=== Final ===
15 May 2010

UE Sant Julià	1–0	UE Santa Coloma

Estadi Comunal d'Aixovall, Aixovall
