= Víctor Rodríguez (Andorran footballer) =

Andorran footballer (born 1987)

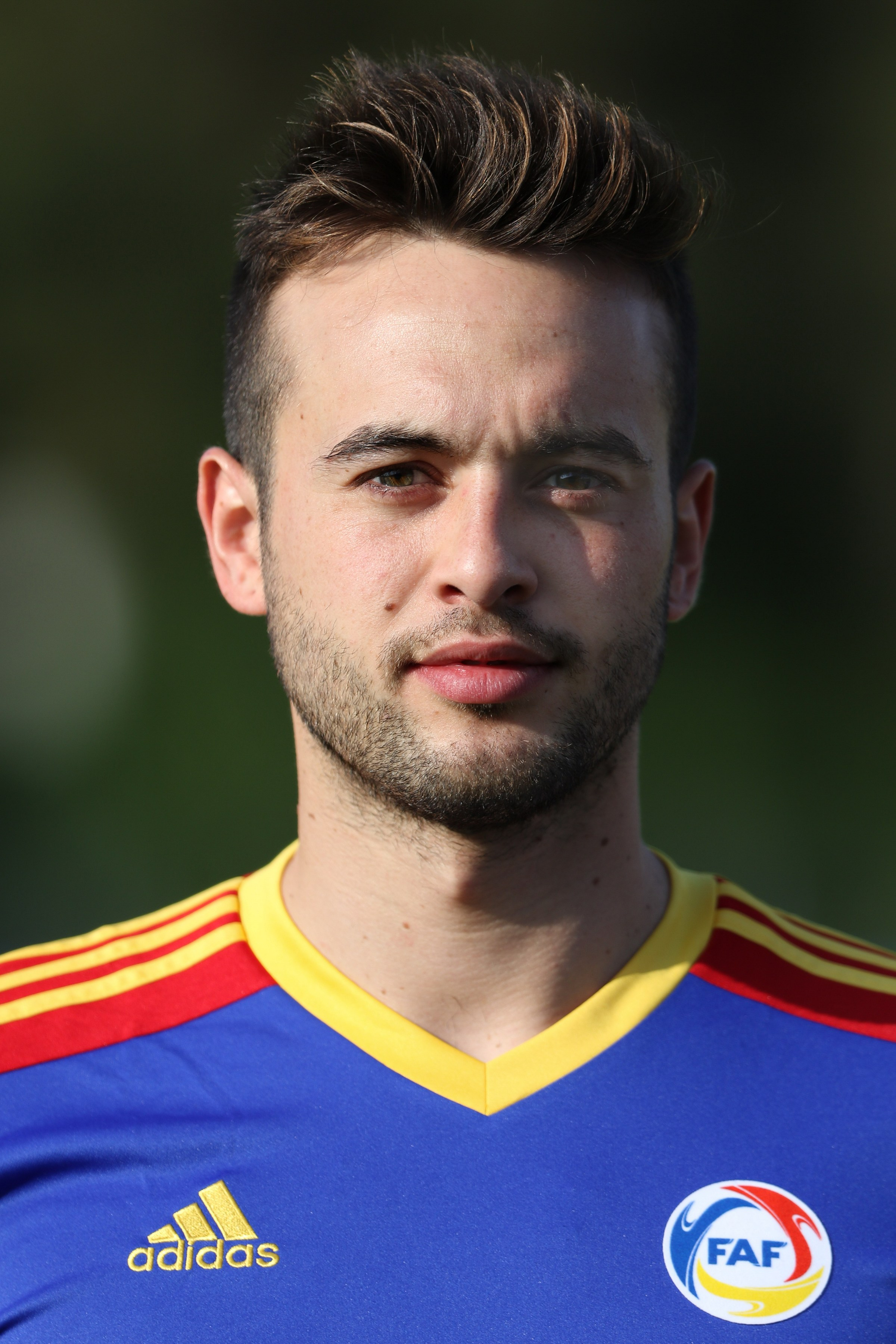
- Rodríguez in the Andorra national football team in 2016

Personal information
- Full name: Víctor Rodríguez Soria
- Date of birth: 7 September 1987 (age 39)
- Place of birth: Santa Coloma, Andorra
- Position: Defender

Senior career*
Years	Team	Apps	(Gls)
2005–2010	FC Santa Coloma		
2010–2015	UE Santa Coloma		
2015–2019	FC Santa Coloma	117	(14)
2019–2020	UE Engordany	18	(1)

International career
2008–2019	Andorra	30	(0)
- * Club domestic league appearances and goals

Víctor Rodríguez Soria (born 7 September 1987) is an Andorran retired international footballer who played as a defender. Rodríguez made his international debut in 2008.

== Career ==
On 6 September 2015, in a 3–0 away loss to Bosnia and Herzegovina in UEFA Euro 2016 qualifying, Muhamed Bešić threw his chewing gum at Rodríguez, who retaliated; both were given straight red cards.
