= 1999–2000 Primera Divisió =

Primera Divisió
- Season: 1999–2000
- Champions: Constel·lació Esportiva
- Relegated: CE Benfica
- UEFA Cup: Constel·lació Esportiva
- Matches played: 91
- Goals scored: 205 (2.25 per match)
- Biggest home win: Constel·lació Esportiva 11-0 Sporting Club d'Escaldes
- Biggest away win: Sporting Club d'Escaldes 1-9 Constel·lació Esportiva
- Highest scoring: Constel·lació Esportiva 11-0 Sporting Club d'Escaldes

Statistics of Primera Divisió in the 1999/2000 season.

== Overview ==
It was contested by 8 teams, and Constel·lació Esportiva won the championship.

== League table ==
Pos	Team	Pld	W	D	L	GF	GA	GD	Pts	Qualification or relegation
1	Constel·lació (C)	12	12	0	0	70	6	+64	36	Qualification to UEFA Cup qualifying round
2	FC Santa Coloma	12	9	1	2	34	10	+24	28	
3	Inter d'Escaldes	12	6	2	4	24	25	−1	20	
4	Encamp	12	5	2	5	33	28	+5	17	
5	Sant Julià	12	3	1	8	23	36	−13	10	
6	Principat	12	2	0	10	16	41	−25	6	
7	Sporting d'Escaldes	12	1	2	9	12	66	−54	5	
8	Benito	0	0	0	0	0	0	0	0	Withdrew

Rules for classification: 1) points; 2) head-to-head points; 3) head-to-head goal difference; 4) goal difference; 5) number of goals scored; 6) fair-play points; 7) playoff match
(C) Champions

== Results ==
Home \ Away	CON	ENC	INT	PRI	SFC	SJU	SPO
Constel·lació		10–0	2–0	6–2	2–1	5–0	11–0
Encamp	1–2		1–2	7–2	1–3	2–2	5–3
Inter d'Escaldes	1–8	1–1		3–1	0–6	2–1	5–1
Principat	0–5	0–4	0–5		0–3	2–3	1–0
FC Santa Coloma	0–2	2–0	2–0	4–1		3–1	6–1
Sant Julià	0–8	0–4	2–5	1–0	0–2		11–0
Sporting d'Escaldes	1–9	1–7	0–0	0–7	2–2	3–2	

Legend: Blue = home team win; Yellow = draw; Red = away team win.
