= Marc Rebés =

Andorran footballer

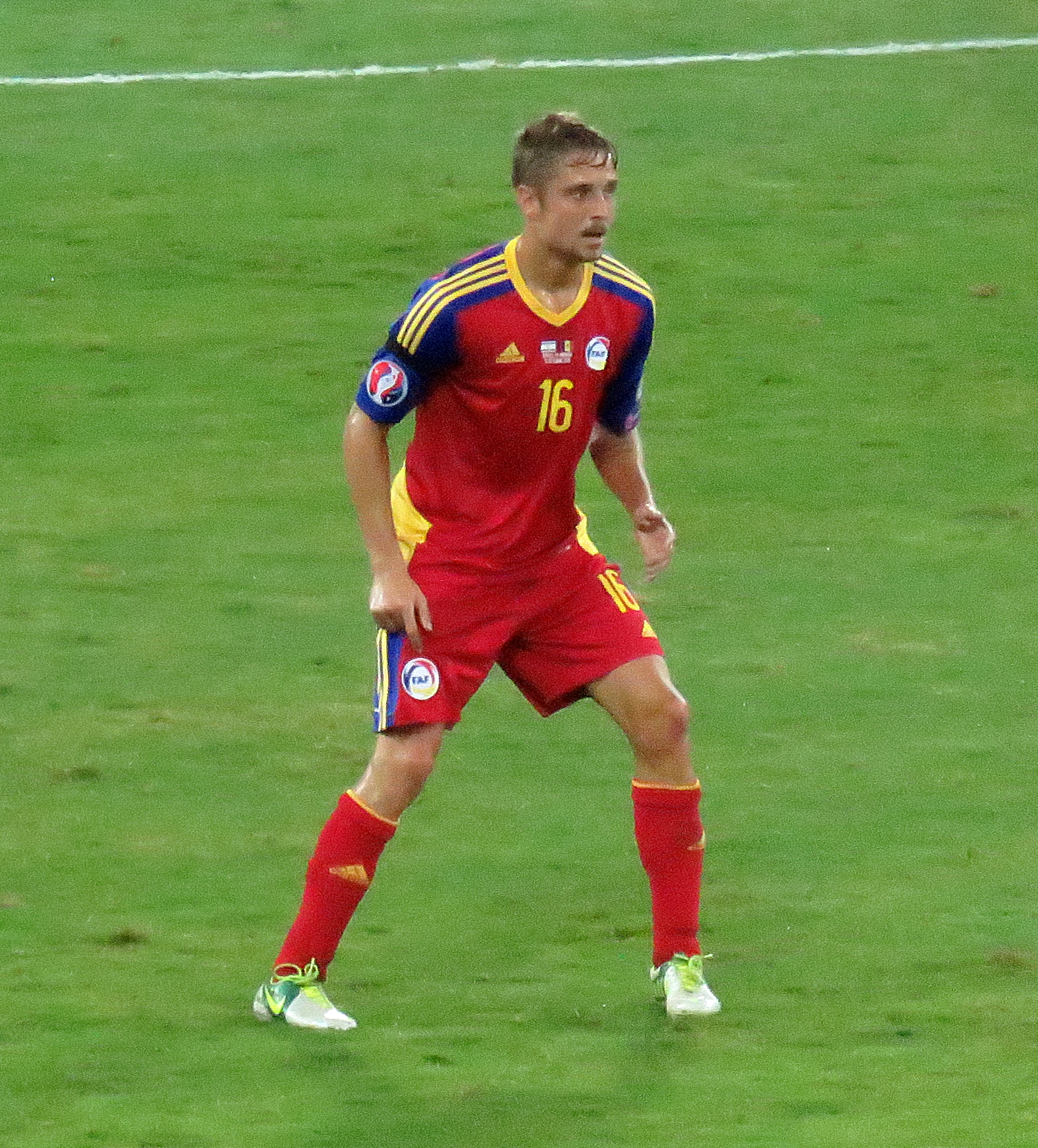

Personal information
- Full name: Marc Rebés Ruiz
- Date of birth: 3 July 1994 (age 32)
- Place of birth: Santa Coloma, Andorra
- Height: 1.75 m (5 ft 9 in)
- Positions: Centre-back; midfielder

Team information
- Current team: Rànger's
- Number: 5

Senior career*
Years	Team	Apps	(Gls)
2010–2012	Engordany	0	(0)
2012–2021	FC Santa Coloma	130+	(13+)
2021–2022	Stade Beaucairois	1	(0)
2022	UE Santa Coloma	12	(0)
2022–2023	FC Santa Coloma	19	(1)
2023–2025	Pas de la Casa	28	(0)
2025–2026	Rànger's	13	(2)
2026	FC Santa Coloma	0	(0)
2026–	Rànger's	0	(0)

International career^{‡}
2015–	Andorra	68	(3)
- * Club domestic league appearances and goals as of 16 May 2026 ‡ National team caps and goals as of 17 November 2025

Marc Rebés Ruiz (born 3 July 1994) is an Andorran professional footballer who plays as a centre-back and midfielder for Primera Divisió club FC Rànger's and the Andorra national team.

== International career ==
Rebés made his international debut on 6 June 2015 in a friendly against Equatorial Guinea. On 9 June 2017 Rebés scored his first international goal in a 1–0 victory over Hungary in 2018 FIFA World Cup qualifying. The game-winning goal provided Andorra with its first competitive victory in 66 matches spanning nearly 13 years, and its second competitive victory overall.

=== International goals ===
Last updated on 14 November 2020. Scores and results list Andorra's goal tally first.

#	Date	Venue	Opponent	Score	Result	Competition
1	9 June 2017	Estadi Nacional, Andorra la Vella, Andorra	Hungary	1–0	1–0	2018 FIFA World Cup qualification
2	21 March 2018	Estadio Municipal, La Línea de la Concepción, Spain	Liechtenstein	1–0	1–0	Friendly
3	14 November 2020	National Stadium, Ta' Qali, Malta	Malta	1–0	1–3	2020–21 UEFA Nations League D

== Personal life ==
Rebés works as a Commercial Director while also playing football.
