= Joel Martínez =

Joel Martínez may refer to:

- Joel Martínez (footballer, born 1988), Andorran international footballer
- Joel Martínez (footballer, born 1996), Argentine footballer
- Joel Fido Martínez (born 1981), Puerto Rican musician of the reggaeton duo Alexis & Fido
- Joel Neftali Martinez (born 1940), Hispanic-American Bishop of the United Methodist Church
- Walter Joel Martínez (born 1991), Honduran international footballer
- The Kid Mero (Joel Martinez, born 1983), Dominican-American writer, comedian, TV personality and voice actor

== See also ==
- Joe L. Martínez
- Joel (given name)
- Martínez (surname)
