= 2001–02 Primera Divisió =

Primera Divisió
- Season: 2001–02
- Champions: Encamp
- UEFA Cup: Encamp
- UEFA Intertoto Cup: Sant Julià
- Matches played: 80
- Goals scored: 281 (3.51 per match)

Statistics of Primera Divisió in the 2001–02 season.

== Overview ==
It was contested by 8 teams, and FC Encamp won the championship.

== First round ==
Pos	Team	Pld	W	D	L	GF	GA	GD	Pts	Qualification
1	Sant Julià	14	11	2	1	39	9	+30	35	Qualification to Championship round
2	Encamp	14	11	1	2	34	12	+22	34	Qualification to Championship round
3	FC Santa Coloma	14	9	4	1	43	17	+26	31	Qualification to Championship round
4	Rànger's	14	5	4	5	23	20	+3	19	Qualification to Championship round
5	Principat	14	4	2	8	24	32	−8	14	Qualification to Relegation round
6	Lusitans	14	3	3	8	19	30	−11	12	Qualification to Relegation round
7	Inter d'Escaldes	14	2	1	11	15	39	−24	7	Qualification to Relegation round
8	Sporting d'Escaldes	14	1	3	10	11	49	−38	6	Qualification to Relegation round

Rules for classification: 1) points; 2) head-to-head points; 3) head-to-head goal difference; 4) goal difference; 5) number of goals scored; 6) fair-play points; 7) playoff match

Home \ Away	ENC	INT	LUS	PRI	RAN	SFC	SJU	SPO
Encamp		5–1	1–0	2–0	1–0	3–3	0–2	5–1
Inter d'Escaldes	1–3		2–4	0–1	0–3	2–4	0–2	0–3
Lusitans	1–2	0–2		2–2	3–3	1–3	0–4	2–0
Principat	0–1	5–2	2–4		0–1	2–3	1–5	5–0
Rànger's	0–3 (Note: The match between Rànger's and Encamp was rated with 0–3 for Encamp.)	2–0	3–1	1–1		2–4	1–3	1–1
FC Santa Coloma	1–0	1–2	3–0	6–1	2–2		1–1	6–1
Sant Julià	1–2	4–1	3–1	5–0	1–0	0–0		4–1
Sporting d'Escaldes	1–6	2–2	0–0	0–4	0–4	0–6	1–4	

Legend: Blue = home team win; Yellow = draw; Red = away team win.

== Second round ==
=== Championship Round ===
Pos	Team	Pld	W	D	L	GF	GA	GD	Pts	Qualification
1	Encamp (C)	20	14	2	4	43	18	+25	44	Qualification to UEFA Cup qualifying round
2	Sant Julià	20	13	4	3	51	21	+30	43	Qualification to Intertoto Cup first round
3	FC Santa Coloma	20	12	6	2	57	23	+34	42	
4	Rànger's	20	6	5	9	28	36	−8	23	

Rules for classification: 1) points; 2) head-to-head points; 3) head-to-head goal difference; 4) goal difference; 5) number of goals scored; 6) fair-play points; 7) playoff match
(C) Champions

Home \ Away	ENC	RAN	SFC	SJU
Encamp		3–0	2–3	0–1
Rànger's	0–1		1–0	1–5
FC Santa Coloma	1–1	4–0		2–2
Sant Julià	1–2	3–3	0–4	

Legend: Blue = home team win; Yellow = draw; Red = away team win.

=== Relegation Round ===
Pos	Team	Pld	W	D	L	GF	GA	GD	Pts
1	Lusitans	20	6	4	10	32	39	−7	22
2	Principat	20	6	4	10	32	40	−8	22
3	Inter d'Escaldes	20	6	2	12	23	42	−19	20
4	Sporting d'Escaldes	20	2	3	15	15	62	−47	9

Rules for classification: 1) points; 2) head-to-head points; 3) head-to-head goal difference; 4) goal difference; 5) number of goals scored; 6) fair-play points; 7) playoff match

Home \ Away	INT	LUS	PRI	SPO
Inter d'Escaldes		2–3	3–0	1–0
Lusitans	0–1		2–2	4–1
Principat	0–0	3–0 (Note: The match between Principat and Lusitans was canceled when the score was 0–1 in the 87th minute and scored 3–0 for Principat.)		1–2
Sporting d'Escaldes	0–1	0–4	1–2	

Legend: Blue = home team win; Yellow = draw; Red = away team win.
