= Jordi Rubio =

Andorran footballer

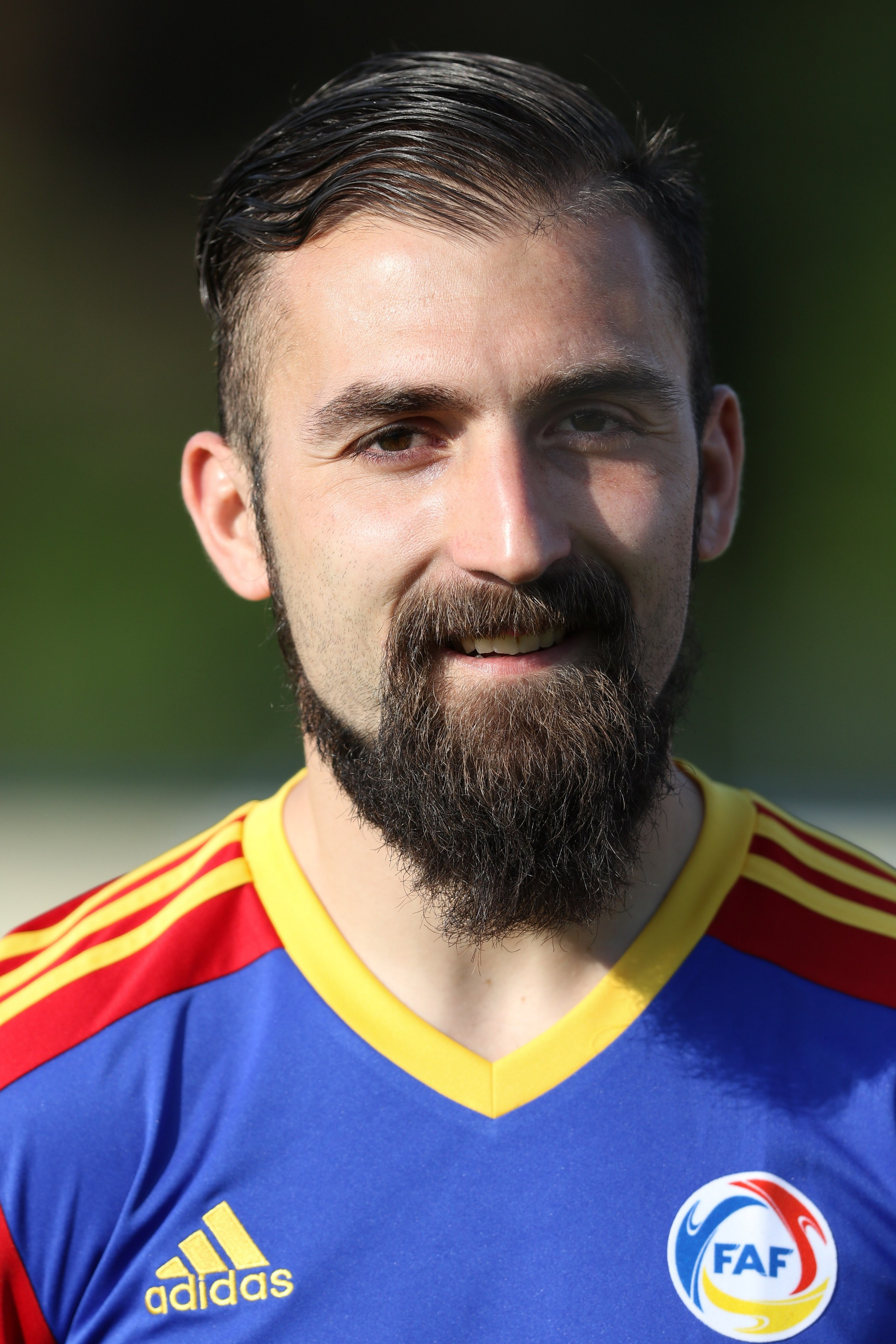
- Jordi Rubio in 2016

Personal information
- Full name: Jordi Rubio Gómez
- Date of birth: 1 November 1987 (age 39)
- Place of birth: Andorra la Vella, Andorra
- Height: 1.73 m (5 ft 8 in)
- Position: Defender

Team information
- Current team: FC Santa Coloma
- Number: 14

Senior career*
Years	Team	Apps	(Gls)
2006–2008	FC Andorra	52	(4)
2008–2018	UE Santa Coloma	153+	(48+)
2018	FC Andorra	9	(2)
2018–2020	UE Santa Coloma	47	(8)
2020–2022	Inter d'Escaldes	37	(0)
2022–2023	UE Engordany	24	(0)
2023–2024	Pas de la Casa	22	(2)
2024–	FC Santa Coloma	9	(0)

International career^{‡}
2006–	Andorra	66	(0)
- * Club domestic league appearances and goals as of 10 February 2025 ‡ National team caps and goals as of 11 June 2024

Jordi Rubio Gómez (born 1 November 1987) is an Andorran international footballer who plays as a defender for FC Santa Coloma.

== Career ==
Rubio began his senior career at FC Andorra in 2006, before moving to Santa Coloma in 2008.

He made his international debut for Andorra in 2006.
