= Manolo Jiménez (footballer, born 1976) =

Andorran footballer

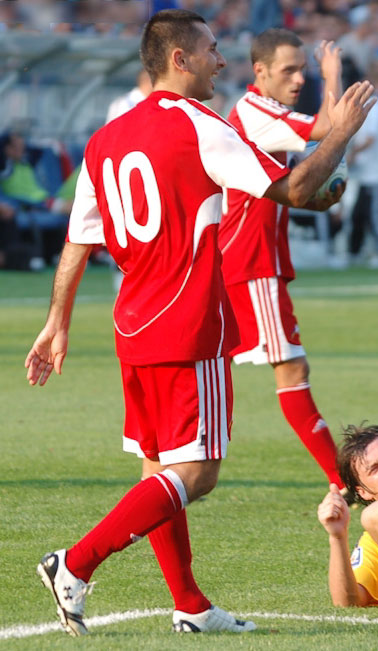

Personal information
- Full name: Manuel Jiménez Soria
- Date of birth: 12 August 1976 (age 50)
- Place of birth: Andorra
- Position: Midfielder

Team information
- Current team: Santa Coloma
- Number: 11

Senior career*
Years	Team	Apps	(Gls)
- Santa Coloma

International career^{‡}
1998–	Andorra	79	(1)
- * Club domestic league appearances and goals as of 21 February 2008 ‡ National team caps and goals as of 28 September 2014

Manuel "Manolo" Jiménez Soria (born 12 August 1976) is an Andorran footballer who currently plays for Santa Coloma and the Andorra national football team.

== International statistics ==
Updated 28 September 2014.

Andorra national team
Year	Apps	Goals
1998	5	0
1999	8	0
2000	8	0
2001	5	0
2002	4	1
2003	6	0
2004	6	0
2005	5	0
2006	4	0
2007	5	0
2008	5	0
2009	7	0
2010	6	0
2011	3	0
2012	1	0
Total	79	1

=== International goal ===
Scores and results list Andorra's goal tally first.

No.	Date	Venue	Opponent	Score	Result	Competition
1.	17 April 2002	Estadi Comunal d'Andorra la Vella, Andorra la Vella, Andorra	Albania	2–0	2–0	Friendly match
