= Guilherme Quichini =

Brazilian footballer (born 1993)

Personal information
- Full name: Guilherme Vinícius Quichini dos Santos
- Date of birth: 15 December 1993 (age 32)
- Place of birth: São Paulo, Brazil
- Position: Defender

Team information
- Current team: UE Santa Coloma
- Number: 5

Youth career
- 2010–2012: Nacional

Senior career*
| Years | Team | Apps | (Gls) |
| 2012–2014 | Nacional | | |
| 2014 | Timbaúba | | |
| 2015 | Quirinópolis | | |
| 2016 | Imperatriz | 6 | (0) |
| 2016–2018 | Famalicão | 11 | (0) |
| 2017–2018 | → F.C. Cesarense (loan) | | |
| 2018–2019 | R.D. Águeda | | |
| 2019–2020 | Valadares Gaia F.C. | | |
| 2020 | Anadia F.C. | | |
| 2021 | A.C. Marinhense | | |
| 2021-2022 | G.D. Vitória de Sernache | | |
| 2023 | Fermentelos | | |
| 2023-2024 | Valadares Gaia F.C. | | |
| 2024-2025 | S.C. Alba | | |
| 2025- | UE Santa Coloma | 22 | (0) |
- * Club domestic league appearances and goals as of 15 June 2026

Guilherme Vinícius Quichini dos Santos (born 15 December 1993), known as Guilherme or Guilherme Quichini, is a Brazilian football player who plays for UE Santa Coloma.

== Club career ==
He made his professional debut in the Segunda Liga for Famalicão on 9 October 2016 in a game against Sporting Covilhã.
