= Andorran Supercup =

Association football match in Andorra

Supercopa Andorrana de Futbol
- Founded: 2003
- Region: Andorra
- Teams: 2
- Current champions: Inter Escaldes (5th title)
- Most championships: FC Santa Coloma (7 titles)

The Andorran Supercup (Catalan: Supercopa Andorrana de Futbol) is the football Supercup of Andorra.

== History ==
It has been played since 2003. It is a single match at the beginning of the season between the winners of the Andorran First Division and the Andorran Cup. Every match is played in the Aixovall, Andorra la Vella.

== Results of the finals ==
| Season | Winner | Score | Runner-up |
|---|---|---|---|
| 2003 | FC Santa Coloma | 3–2 (aet) | UE Sant Julià |
| 2004 | UE Sant Julià | 2–1 | FC Santa Coloma |
| 2005 | FC Santa Coloma | 1–0 | UE Sant Julià |
| 2006 | FC Rànger's | 4–3 (aet) | FC Santa Coloma |
| 2007 | FC Santa Coloma | 1–0 | FC Rànger's |
| 2008 | FC Santa Coloma | 3–0 | UE Sant Julià |
| 2009 | UE Sant Julià | 2–1 | FC Santa Coloma |
| 2010 | UE Sant Julià | 3–2 (aet) | FC Santa Coloma |
| 2011 | UE Sant Julià | 4–3 | FC Santa Coloma |
| 2012 | FC Lusitanos | 2–1 | FC Santa Coloma |
| 2013 | FC Lusitanos | 1–0 | UE Santa Coloma |
| 2014 | UE Sant Julià | 1–0 | FC Santa Coloma |
| 2015 | FC Santa Coloma | 1–1 (5–4 pen.) | UE Sant Julià |
| 2016 | UE Santa Coloma | 1–0 | FC Santa Coloma |
| 2017 | FC Santa Coloma | 1–0 (aet) | UE Santa Coloma |
| 2018 | UE Sant Julià | 2–1 | FC Santa Coloma |
| 2019 | FC Santa Coloma | 2–1 | UE Engordany |
| 2020 | Inter Escaldes | 2–0 | FC Santa Coloma |
| 2021 | Inter Escaldes | 2–1 | UE Sant Julià |
| 2022 | Inter Escaldes | 2–1 | Atlètic Escaldes |
| 2023 | Inter Escaldes | 3–1 | Atlètic Escaldes |
| 2024 | UE Santa Coloma | 2–1 | Inter Escaldes |
| 2025 | Atlètic d'Escaldes | 2–2 (5–3 pen.) | Inter Escaldes |
| 2026 | Inter Escaldes | 2–0 | Atlètic Escaldes |

== Performance by club ==
| Club | Winners | Runners-up | Winning years | Runners-up years |
|---|---|---|---|---|
| FC Santa Coloma | 7 | 10 | 2003, 2005, 2007, 2008, 2015, 2017, 2019 | 2004, 2006, 2009, 2010, 2011, 2012, 2014, 2016, 2018, 2020 |
| UE Sant Julià | 6 | 5 | 2004, 2009, 2010, 2011, 2014, 2018 | 2003, 2005, 2008, 2015, 2021 |
| Inter Escaldes | 5 | 2 | 2020, 2021, 2022, 2023, 2026 | 2024, 2025 |
| UE Santa Coloma | 2 | 2 | 2016, 2024 | 2013, 2017 |
| FC Lusitanos | 2 | – | 2012, 2013 | – |
| Atlètic Escaldes | 1 | 3 | 2025 | 2022, 2023, 2026 |
| FC Rànger's | 1 | 1 | 2006 | 2007 |
| UE Engordany | – | 1 | – | 2019 |
