= 2007–08 Segona Divisió =

Segona Divisió
- Season: 2007-08
- Champions: UE Santa Coloma
- Promoted: UE Santa Coloma
- Matches: 72
- Goals: 324 (4.5 per match)

The 2007–08 season of the Segona Divisió, the second level football competition in Andorra, was held from Autumn 2007 until Spring 2008.

== Overview ==
This season Andorra added an extra team to the Segona Divisió: (Inter Club d'Escaldes reserve team).

== Teams ==
The following 9 clubs comprise the Segona Divisió in 2007-08:

Official Club Name	Home City	Stadium Name	2006/2007 Season
FC Encamp	Encamp	Estadio Comunal de Aixovall	N/A
Atlètic Club d'Escaldes	Escaldes-Engordany	Estadio Comunal de Aixovall	N/A
UE Santa Coloma	Santa Coloma	Estadio Comunal de Aixovall	N/A
CE Principat II	Andorra la Vella	Estadio Comunal de Aixovall	4th
UE Extremenya	La Massana	Estadio Comunal de Aixovall	5th
Sporting Club Escaldes	Escaldes-Engordany	Estadio Comunal de Aixovall	6th
FC Lusitanos II	Andorra la Vella	Estadio Comunal de Aixovall	7th
FC Rànger's II	Andorra la Vella	Estadio Comunal de Aixovall	8th
Inter Club d'Escaldes II	Escaldes-Engordany	Estadio Comunal de Aixovall	N/A

Locations of clubs in the 2007–08 Segona Divisió

== Final standings ==
As of games played May 19, 2008

Pos	Team	Pld	W	D	L	GF	GA	GD	Pts	Promotion or qualification
1	UE Santa Coloma (C, P)	16	14	2	0	66	11	+55	44	Promotion to Primera Divisió
2	UE Extremenya	16	14	0	2	42	13	+29	42	Qualification to Primera Divisió play-offs
3	FC Encamp	16	9	3	4	38	14	+24	30	
4	FC Lusitanos II	16	7	2	7	39	30	+9	23	
5	CE Principat II	16	6	0	10	35	39	−4	18	
6	Atlètic Club d'Escaldes	16	5	2	9	30	33	−3	17	
7	FC Ranger's II	16	4	3	9	24	48	−24	15	
8	Sporting Escaldes	16	4	0	12	33	66	−33	12	
9	Inter Club d'Escaldes II	16	2	2	12	17	70	−53	8	

Source: GSA
(C) Champions; (P) Promoted
