= Gerard Gómez (footballer) =

Spanish footballer

Personal information
- Full name: Gerard Gómez Gómez
- Date of birth: 2 August 2002 (age 24)
- Place of birth: Barcelona, Spain
- Height: 1.80 m (5 ft 11 in)
- Position: Centre-back

Team information
- Current team: Atlético Morelia

Youth career
- 2017: Damm
- 2017–2021: Barcelona

Senior career*
Years	Team	Apps	(Gls)
2022	Rayo Vallecano B	5	(0)
2022–2024	FC Santa Coloma	36	(2)
2024–	Atlético Morelia	0	(0)
- * Club domestic league appearances and goals as of 28 July 2024

Gerard Gómez Gómez (born 2 August 2002) is a Spanish professional footballer who plays as a centre-back for Atlético Morelia.

== Career ==
Gómez began his youth career with CF Damm, progressing to FC Barcelona's La Masia academy, where he honed his skills over four years. He later transitioned to senior football with Rayo Vallecano B, making 5 appearances in Spain's lower divisions. He then moved to Andorra's FC Santa Coloma, where he featured in 36 matches and scored 2 goals. During his tenure, he participated in the UEFA Conference League, gaining international experience, and recently in August 2024, Gómez signed with Atlético Morelia.
