= Constel·lació Esportiva =

- Full name: Constel·lació Esportiva
- Founded: 1998
- Dissolved: 2000
- Ground: Estadi Comunal d'Aixovall; Andorra la Vella Andorra
- Capacity: 1,800
- League: Campionat de Lliga
- 1999–2000: 1st

Constel·lació Esportiva (Catalan: 'Constellation Sports') was an Andorran football club from Andorra La Vella. The team began play in the Andorran First Division (Campionat de Lliga) in 1998 and dominated the league in 2000, beating FC Encamp 6–0 in the championship. That summer, the Andorran Football Federation accused the team of trying to buy votes from other teams and of financial irregularities. Additionally, the team did not want to divide its winnings from the UEFA cup with the league. The team was kicked out of the First Division for seven years as a result of this, though the club appealed the decision.

== Honours ==
- Campionat de Lliga: 1
  1999–00
- Copa Constitució: 1
  1999–00

== UEFA Competitions ==
Season	Competition	Round	Club	Home	Away	Agg.
2000–01	2000–01 UEFA Cup	1QR	(Spain) Rayo Vallecano	0–10	0–6	0–16
