= Adrià Arjona =

Spanish footballer

Personal information
- Full name: Adrià Arjona Marín
- Date of birth: 28 February 1996 (age 30)
- Place of birth: Vila-seca, Spain
- Height: 1.76 m (5 ft 9 in)
- Position: Winger

Team information
- Current team: FC Santa Coloma
- Number: 18

Youth career
- –2006: Vilaseca
- 2006–2009: Barcelona
- 2009–2012: Gimnàstic
- 2012–2015: Barcelona

Senior career*
Years	Team	Apps	(Gls)
2015–2016	Morell	35	(5)
2016–2019	Reus B	62	(7)
2016–2017	→ Sant Andreu (loan)	38	(6)
2018	Reus	1	(0)
2019–2020	Prat	24	(3)
2020–2021	Llosetense	7	(0)
2021	Huesca B	12	(4)
2021–2023	Recreativo	64	(12)
2023–2024	Vélez	13	(0)
2024	Guadalajara	5	(0)
2024–2025	Melilla	15	(0)
2025	Minera	15	(1)
2025–	FC Santa Coloma	22	(0)
- * Club domestic league appearances and goals as of 15 June 2026

Adrià Arjona Marín (born 28 February 1996) is a Spanish footballer who plays as a winger for Andorran club FC Santa Coloma.

== Club career ==
Born in Vila-seca, Tarragona, Catalonia, Arjona joined FC Barcelona's La Masia in 2006, from CF Vilaseca. Released in 2009, he spent three seasons at Gimnàstic de Tarragona before returning to Barça in 2012.

On 23 August 2015, after finishing his formation, Arjona joined CF Reus Deportiu and was assigned to the farm team CD Morell in Tercera División. On 17 August of the following year, he was loaned to fellow league team UE Sant Andreu for a year.

Upon returning, Arjona was assigned to the B-team, now also in the fourth division. He made his first-team debut on 12 September, starting in a 2–1 away win against CA Osasuna, for the season's Copa del Rey.

Arjona made his Segunda División debut on 23 September 2018, replacing Alfred Planas in a 1–1 home draw against Gimnàstic de Tarragona. On 18 July of the following year, he signed for AE Prat in Segunda División B, after Reus' severe economic problems.

In 2020, Arjona joined fourth division side CD Llosetense. In January of the following year, he moved abroad to join South Korean side Gimpo FC, but despite training with the club and playing friendlies, he was not offered a contract.

On 22 February 2021, Arjona joined SD Huesca and was assisgned to the B-team also in division four. On 11 July, after helping the B's to achieve promotion to Segunda División RFEF, he agreed to a deal with Recreativo de Huelva in Tercera División RFEF.

Arjona continued to feature in Segunda Federación in the following years, representing Vélez CF, CD Guadalajara, UD Melilla and CD Minera.
