= 2009–10 Primera Divisió =

Primera Divisió
- Season: 2009–10
- Champions: FC Santa Coloma
- Relegated: Engordany
- Champions League: FC Santa Coloma
- Europa League: UE Santa Coloma; Sant Julià; FC Lusitanos
- Matches: 80
- Goals: 319 (3.99 per match)
- Biggest home win: Sant Julià 6-0 Principat
- Biggest away win: Engordany 0-10 Sant Julià
- Highest scoring: Encamp 1-10 Sant Julià

The 2009–10 Primera Divisió was the fifteenth season of top-tier football in Andorra. It began in September 2009 and ended in May 2010. UE Sant Julià were the defending champions. FC Santa Coloma won the league championship and entered the first qualifying round of the 2010–11 UEFA Champions League, where they were defeated by Maltese side Birkirkara F.C. UE Engordany was relegated and will be replaced by Segona Divisió champions Casa Estrella del Benfica for the 2010–11 season.

== Competition format ==
The participating teams first play a conventional round-robin schedule with every team playing each opponent once home and once away for a total of 14 games. The league will then be split up in two groups of four teams with each of them playing teams within their group, a home-and-away cycle of games. The top four teams compete for the championship. The bottom four clubs play out one direct relegation spot and one relegation play-off spot. Records earned in the First Round will be taken over to the respective Second Rounds.

== Promotion and relegation from 2008–09 ==
FC Ranger's were relegated after last season due to finishing in 8th place. They were replaced by Segona Divisió champions FC Encamp.

Inter Club d'Escaldes and Segona Divisió runners-up Atlètic Club d'Escaldes played a two-legged relegation play-off. Inter kept their spot in Primera Divisió by winning 10–9 on penalties after an aggregated 3–3 tie with their village rivals.

== Stadia and locations ==
Location of teams in Primera Divisió 2009-10

== First round ==
=== League table ===
Pos	Team	Pld	W	D	L	GF	GA	GD	Pts	Qualification
1	FC Santa Coloma	14	11	3	0	38	10	+28	36	Qualification to Championship round
2	Sant Julià	14	10	2	2	59	12	+47	32	Qualification to Championship round
3	UE Santa Coloma	14	10	2	2	41	20	+21	32	Qualification to Championship round
4	Lusitanos	14	7	2	5	30	17	+13	23	Qualification to Championship round
5	Principat	14	7	0	7	27	33	−6	21	Qualification to Relegation round
6	Encamp	14	3	1	10	19	50	−31	10	Qualification to Relegation round
7	Inter Club d'Escaldes	14	1	1	12	10	41	−31	4	Qualification to Relegation round
8	Engordany	14	1	1	12	11	52	−41	4	Qualification to Relegation round

Source: fedandfut.com (in Catalan and English)
Rules for classification: 1) points; 2) goal difference; 3) number of goals scored.

=== Results ===
Home \ Away	ENC	ENG	INT	LUS	PRI	SFC	SUE	SJU
Encamp		1–1	2–0	0–3	2–4	0–2	2–5	1–10
Engordany	0–5		3–2	1–3	3–4	1–2	1–4	0–10
Inter Club d'Escaldes	2–3	1–0		1–1	1–2	0–4	1–2	0–7
Lusitanos	5–1	4–0	5–2		0–2	1–3	1–2	2–3
Principat	4–0	2–0	3–0	0–2		0–1	1–4	1–3
FC Santa Coloma	3–0	5–1	4–0	2–1	6–1		2–2	0–0
UE Santa Coloma	5–0	5–0	1–0	0–2	5–3	2–2		3–2
Sant Julià	6–2	4–0	4–0	0–0	6–0	1–2	3–1	

Source: fedandfut.com (in Catalan and English)
Legend: Blue = home team win; Yellow = draw; Red = away team win.

== Second round ==
=== Championship Round ===
Pos	Team	Pld	W	D	L	GF	GA	GD	Pts	Qualification
1	FC Santa Coloma (C)	20	13	7	0	46	14	+32	46	Qualification to Champions League first qualifying round
2	UE Santa Coloma	20	13	4	3	50	26	+24	43	Qualification to Europa League first qualifying round
3	Sant Julià	20	12	5	3	69	18	+51	41	Qualification to Europa League second qualifying round (Note: UE Sant Julià won the 2010 Copa Constitució competition and entered the second qualifying round of UEFA Europa League.)
4	Lusitanos	20	7	3	10	34	32	+2	24	Qualification to Europa League first qualifying round

Source: fedandfut.com (in Catalan and English)
Rules for classification: 1) points; 2) goal difference; 3) number of goals scored.
(C) Champions
Notes:

Home \ Away	LUS	SFC	SUE	SJU
Lusitanos		0–0	1–2	2–3
FC Santa Coloma	4–1		1–1	1–1
UE Santa Coloma	2–0	1–2		1–1
Sant Julià	4–0	0–0	1–2	

Source: fedandfut.com (in Catalan and English)
Legend: Blue = home team win; Yellow = draw; Red = away team win.

=== Relegation Round ===
Pos	Team	Pld	W	D	L	GF	GA	GD	Pts	Qualification or relegation
5	Principat	20	8	2	10	42	50	−8	26	
6	Inter Club d'Escaldes	20	6	1	13	25	49	−24	19	
7	Encamp (O)	20	4	3	13	31	67	−36	15	Qualification to relegation play-offs
8	Engordany (R)	20	4	1	15	22	63	−41	13	Relegation to Segona Divisió

Source: fedandfut.com (in Catalan and English)
Rules for classification: 1) points; 2) goal difference; 3) number of goals scored.
(O) Play-off winners; (R) Relegated

Home \ Away	ENC	ENG	INT	PRI
Encamp		1–4	1–3	3–3
Engordany	1–2		1–4	2–1
Inter Club d'Escaldes	1–0	2–1		2–3
Principat	5–5	1–2	2–3	

Source: fedandfut.com (in Catalan and English)
Legend: Blue = home team win; Yellow = draw; Red = away team win.

== Relegation playoffs ==
Encamp, who finished seventh in the league, competed in a two-legged relegation playoff against Extremenya, who finished third in the Segona Divisió (promotion-ineligible Lusitanos B finished second), for one spot in 2010–11 Primera Divisió. Encamp won the playoff, 5 – 2 on aggregate, thus keeping their place in Primera Divisió.

25 April 2010
18:00 CEST

Encamp	2 – 1	Extremenya

Estadi Comunal d'Aixovall, Aixovall

15 May 2010
20:00 CEST

Extremenya	1 – 3	Encamp

Estadi Comunal d'Aixovall, Aixovall

== Top goalscorers ==
Including matches played on 11 October 2009; Source: Soccerway

4 goals

- (Portugal) Luis Miguel Dos Reis (FC Lusitanos)
- (Portugal) Pedro Miguel Reis (FC Lusitanos)

3 goals

- (Spain) Marcelo Iguacel (CE Principat)
- (Andorra) Gabi Riera (UE Sant Julià)
- (Argentina) Norberto Urbani (FC Santa Coloma)

2 goals

- (Andorra) Víctor Bernat (UE Santa Coloma)
- (Brazil) Luis Miguel (UE Santa Coloma)
- (Spain) Daniel Mejias (UE Sant Julià)
