= Ludovic Clemente =

Andorran footballer

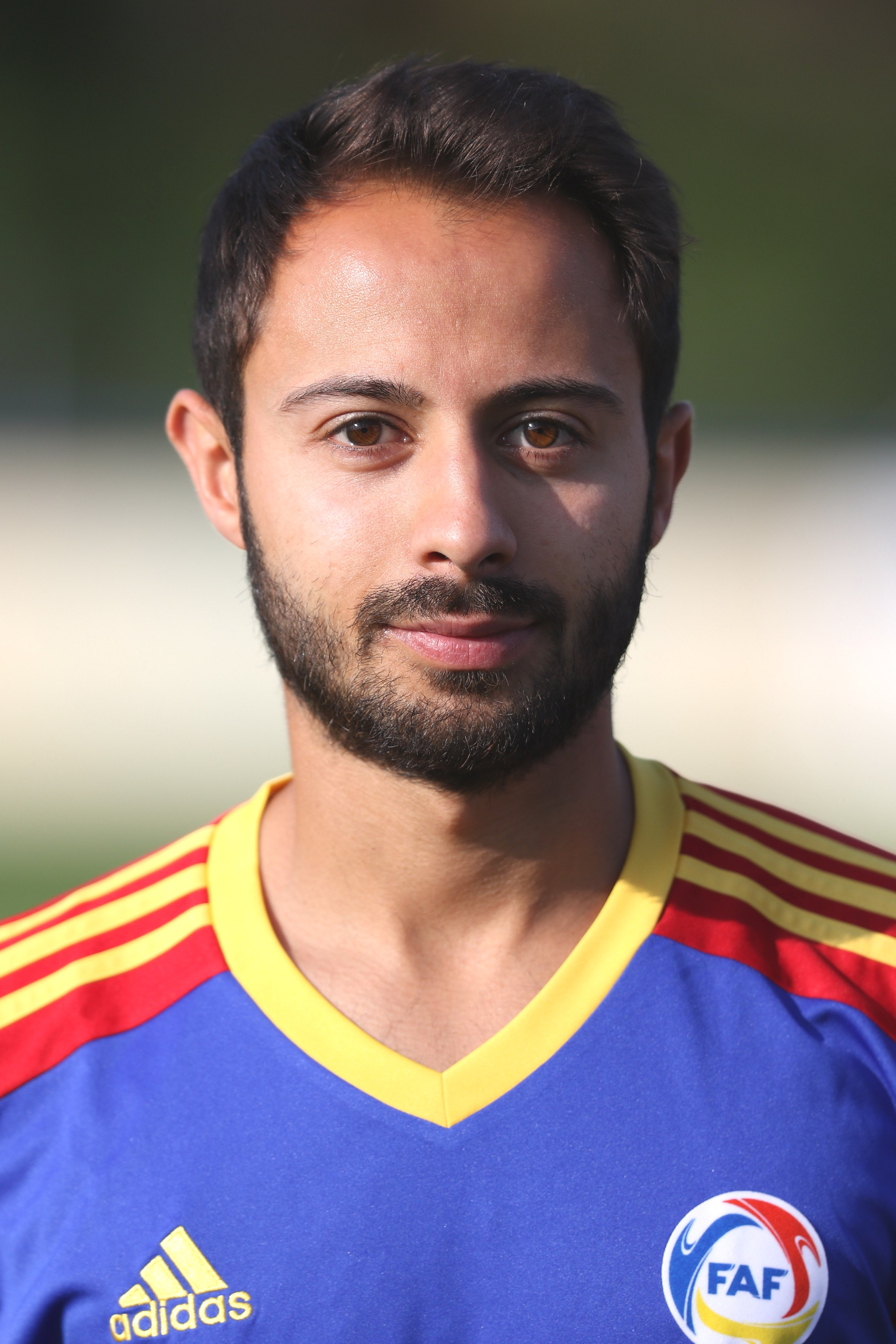

Personal information
- Full name: Ludovic Clemente Garcés
- Date of birth: May 9, 1986 (age 40)
- Place of birth: Andorra la Vella, Andorra
- Height: 1.71 m (5 ft 7 1/2 in)
- Position: Midfielder

Senior career*
Years	Team	Apps	(Gls)
2004–2007	FC Andorra	67	(14)
2007	Manresa	6	(0)
2007–2009	FC Andorra	56	(14)
2009–2011	FC Andorra (indoor)		
2011–2020	FC Andorra	241	(37)
2020–2022	Inter d'Escaldes	25	(2)
2022–2024	UE Santa Coloma	20	(1)

International career^{‡}
2005–2024	Andorra	47	(0)
- * Club domestic league appearances and goals as of 20 May 2024 ‡ National team caps and goals as of 4 June 2024

Ludovic Clemente Garcés (born May 9, 1986) is a former Andorran footballer.
