= Juan Camilo Becerra =

Colombian footballer (born 1998)

Personal information
- Full name: Juan Camilo Becerra Maya
- Date of birth: 23 February 1998 (age 28)
- Place of birth: Valledupar, Colombia
- Height: 1.82 m (6 ft 0 in)
- Position: Forward

Team information
- Current team: FC Santa Coloma
- Number: 17

Youth career
- 2016–2017: Granada

Senior career*
Years	Team	Apps	(Gls)
2017	Granada B	1	(0)
2017–2020	Watford	0	(0)
2017–2018	→ Valladolid B (loan)	18	(3)
2018–2019	→ Teruel (loan)	27	(6)
2019–2020	→ Cornellà (loan)	22	(5)
2020–2023	Espanyol B	58	(19)
2021–2022	→ Ponferradina (loan)	5	(0)
2022	→ Gimnàstic (loan)	10	(1)
2023	Envigado	11	(0)
2024	Lleida Esportiu	15	(3)
2024–2025	Tudelano	2	(0)
2026–	FC Santa Coloma	5	(1)
- * Club domestic league appearances and goals as of 15 June 2026

Juan Camilo Becerra Maya (born 23 February 1998) is a Colombian professional footballer who plays as a forward for Primera Divisió club FC Santa Coloma.

== Club career ==
Born in Valledupar, Becerra moved to Spain in July 2016 to play for Granada CF, after impressing in an Udinese Calcio academy in Barranquilla. After impressing with the Juvenil A squad, he made his senior debut with the reserves on 12 May 2017, coming on as a late substitute for compatriot Luis Suárez in a 2–1 Segunda División B home win against Córdoba CF B.

In July 2017, Becerra had his federative rights bought by Watford, and subsequently moved on loan to Real Valladolid Promesas, also in the third division, for one year. In the following two seasons, he also appeared in the same category after representing CD Teruel and UE Cornellà, also on loan.

On 25 August 2020, Becerra signed a three-year contract with RCD Espanyol, and was initially assigned to the B-team also in the third level. On 6 July of the following year, after scoring 11 goals, he moved to Segunda División side SD Ponferradina on a one-year loan deal.

Becerra made his professional debut on 14 August 2021, coming on as a late substitute for Yuri de Souza in a 1–0 home win over AD Alcorcón. The following 31 January, after just 69 minutes of actions in six matches overall, his loan was cut short, and he moved to Primera División RFEF side Gimnàstic de Tarragona just hours later.
