= Daniel Milstein =

American entrepreneur (born 1975)

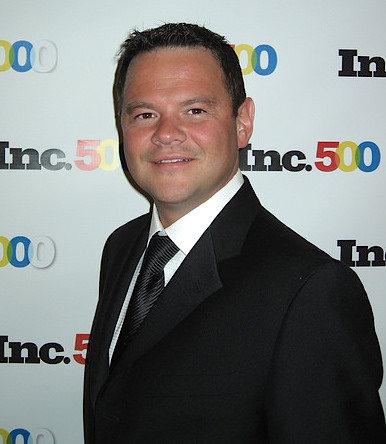
- Milstein at the INC. 500 awards in 2009
- Born: November 8, 1975 (age 50); Kyiv, Ukrainian SSR, Soviet Union
- Education: Cleary University
- Occupations: Entrepreneur, author, founder & CEO of Gold Star Financial Group
- Employer: Gold Star Financial Group
- Website: DanMilstein.com

Daniel Milstein (Ukrainian: Даніель Мільштейн; Russian: Даниэль Мильштейн; born November 8, 1975) is an American entrepreneur of Jewish–Ukrainian origin, agent of many Russian NHL players. Milstein’s 2013 autobiography 17 Cents and a Dream detailed his family’s emigration from Ukraine on the day the country affirmed its independence from the then-USSR. He is the Founder and CEO of Gold Star Financial Group, NHL agent with Gold Star Hockey. He is the founder and owner of Gold Star group, which includes Gold Star Financial Group and Gold Star Sports. Notable clients include Pavel Datsyuk, Nikita Kucherov and Ilya Mikheyev.

== Early life and education ==
Daniel Milstein was born to a Ukrainian-Jewish family in Kyiv, Ukraine, then part of the Soviet Union. He was 10 years old when the Chernobyl nuclear plant blew up 78 miles north of his home in Kyiv, Ukraine, forcing a mandatory evacuation in 1986 and eventually political refugee status. He then moved to the United States. Milstein wrote 17 Cents and a Dream, about his family’s emigration to the United States. He wrote about his family’s arrival and starting from nothing to building Gold Star Companies. Milstein has written three other books including Rule #1 Don’t Be #2, released in 2017.

== Career ==
Milstein graduated from Cleary University before founding Gold Star Financial Group in 2000. The company began as a mortgage provider based in Ann Arbor, Michigan. Milstein didn’t engage in the subprime bubble and had significant growth during the 2008 mortgage crisis. They were on Inc.’s 2009 list of 500 Fastest-Growing privately-held companies and Crain's Detroit Business NewsLetter named Milstein on their list of "40 Under 40 in Detroit”.

Milstein was a friend and interpreter of Pavel Datsyuk before becoming his agent and managed negotiations for Datsyuk’s retirement from the NHL. After that, Milstein became the agent for several other Russian NHL players. In December 2016, Milstein (as Gold Star Sports Management) stepped in during Artemi Panarin’s contract negotiation with the Chicago Blackhawks. The Blackhawks and Panarin agreed to a two-year extension worth $12 million; Panarin was later traded to the Columbus Blue Jackets. Danis Zaripov was represented by Milstein in negotiations with the NHL after being banned by the IIHF. Zaripov was declared eligible to play in September 2017.

Milstein represents several other Russian players including Ivan Demidov, Nikita Zaitsev, Nikita Zadorov, Alexey Marchenko, Andrei Mironov, Vladislav Namestnikov, Ilya Mikheyev, Mikhail Sergachev, and Klim Kostin. His Hockey clientele also includes Vezina Trophy winner Andrei Vasilevskiy of the Tampa Bay Lightning and Hart Trophy winner and Tampa Bay teammate Nikita Kucherov both of whom signed eight-year contract extensions for $76 million each.

== Bibliography ==
- The ABC of Sales: Lessons from a Superstar (2011) GoldStar Publishing, MI. ISBN 0983552711
- 17 Cents and a Dream: My Incredible Journey from the USSR to Living the American Dream (2013) GoldStar Publishing, MI. ISBN 0983552746
- Street Smart Selling: How to Be a Sales Superstar (2014) GoldStar Publishing, MI. ISBN 978-0983552772
- Rule #1 Don’t be #2 (2007) GoldStar Publishing, MI. ISBN 1947165038
