= Rely Cabral =

Cape Verdean footballer

Personal information
- Full name: Rely Selson Cabral de Barros
- Date of birth: 6 May 1997 (age 29)
- Place of birth: Bembibre, Spain
- Height: 1.80 m (5 ft 11 in)
- Position: Winger

Team information
- Current team: UE Santa Coloma
- Number: 17

Youth career
- Ponferradina

Senior career*
Years	Team	Apps	(Gls)
2016–2017	Zamora	37	(5)
2017–2018	Barco	36	(8)
2018–2019	Ourense	37	(10)
2019–2021	Leioa	55	(6)
2021–2022	Don Benito	33	(6)
2022	Othellos Athienou	11	(0)
2023	Vélez	11	(1)
2023–2024	Arandina	32	(1)
2024–2025	Don Benito	23	(0)
2025–	UE Santa Coloma	20	(1)

International career^{‡}
2021–	Cape Verde	1	(0)
- * Club domestic league appearances and goals as of 15 June 2026 ‡ National team caps and goals as of 04:38, 9 June 2021 (UTC)

Rely Selson Cabral de Barros (born 6 May 1997) is a footballer who plays as a winger for Andorran Primera Divisió club UE Santa Coloma. Born in Spain, he represents the Cape Verde national team.

== Professional career ==
A youth product of Ponferradina, Cabral began his footballing career with Zamora, Barco, and Ourense. He transferred to Leioa in the Segunda División B on 5 August 2019.

== International career ==
Born in Spain, Cabral is of Cape Verdean descent. He was called up to the Cape Verde national team for a pair of friendlies in June 2021. He debuted with the Cape Verde national team in a friendly 2–0 loss to Senegal on 8 June 2021.
