= 2008–09 Primera Divisió =

Primera Divisió
- Season: 2008–09
- Champions: UE Sant Julià; 2nd Andorran title
- Relegated: FC Rànger's
- Champions League: UE Sant Julià
- Europa League: FC Santa Coloma (via domestic cup)
- Matches: 80
- Goals: 391 (4.89 per match)
- Biggest home win: Sant Julià 18–0 Engordany
- Biggest away win: Rànger's 0–12 FC Santa Coloma
- Highest scoring: Sant Julià 18–0 Engordany

The 2008–09 Primera Divisió was the fourteenth season of top-tier football in Andorra. It began on 21 September 2008 and ended on 7 May 2009. FC Santa Coloma were the defending champions.

== Competition format ==
The participating teams first played a conventional round-robin schedule with every team playing each opponent once home and once away for a total of 14 games. The league was then split up in two groups of four teams with each of them playing teams within their group a home-and-away cycle of games. The top four teams competed for the championship. The bottom four clubs played out one direct relegation spot and one relegation play-off spot. Records earned in the first round were taken over to the respective second rounds.

== Promotion and relegation ==
Casa Estrella del Benfica were relegated after the last season due to finishing in 8th place. They were replaced by Segona Divisió champions UE Santa Coloma.

Further, UE Engordany and Segona Divisió runners-up UE Extremenya played a two-legged relegation play-off. Engordany kept their spot in Primera Divisió by winning 5–3 on aggregate.

== First round ==
| Pos | Team | Pld | W | D | L | GF | GA | GD | Pts | Qualification |
|---|---|---|---|---|---|---|---|---|---|---|
| 1 | Sant Julià | 14 | 11 | 2 | 1 | 69 | 10 | +59 | 35 | Qualification to Championship round |
| 2 | FC Santa Coloma | 14 | 10 | 3 | 1 | 58 | 5 | +53 | 33 | Qualification to Championship round |
| 3 | Lusitanos | 14 | 10 | 0 | 4 | 36 | 17 | +19 | 30 | Qualification to Championship round |
| 4 | Principat | 14 | 8 | 1 | 5 | 32 | 31 | +1 | 25 | Qualification to Championship round |
| 5 | UE Santa Coloma | 14 | 6 | 3 | 5 | 35 | 28 | +7 | 21 | Qualification to Relegation round |
| 6 | Engordany | 14 | 3 | 0 | 11 | 21 | 75 | −54 | 9 | Qualification to Relegation round |
| 7 | Inter Club d'Escaldes | 14 | 2 | 1 | 11 | 12 | 48 | −36 | 7 | Qualification to Relegation round |
| 8 | Rànger's | 14 | 1 | 0 | 13 | 22 | 71 | −49 | 3 | Qualification to Relegation round |

Source: RSSSF
Rules for classification: 1) points; 2) goal difference; 3) number of goals scored.

| Home \ Away | ENG | INT | LUS | PRI | RAN | SFC | SUE | SJU |
|---|---|---|---|---|---|---|---|---|
| Engordany | | 3–2 | 0–4 | 2–3 | 5–4 | 0–7 | 1–4 | 1–7 |
| Inter Club d'Escaldes | 2–4 | | 0–4 | 0–1 | 3–1 | 0–6 | 2–2 | 1–5 |
| Lusitanos | 4–1 | 2–0 | | 2–1 | 5–2 | 0–2 | 5–1 | 0–1 |
| Principat | 4–1 | 2–0 | 2–3 | | 5–4 | 0–7 | 5–0 | 0–6 |
| Rànger's | 4–1 | 1–2 | 1–3 | 0–7 | | 0–12 | 0–3 | 2–6 |
| FC Santa Coloma | 6–0 | 8–0 | 0–2 | 0–0 | 4–1 | | 0–0 | 1–0 |
| UE Santa Coloma | 6–2 | 4–0 | 3–2 | 0–1 | 9–1 | 1–4 | | 2–2 |
| Sant Julià | 18–0 | 5–0 | 3–0 | 6–1 | 6–1 | 1–1 | 3–0 | |

Source: RSSSF
Legend: Blue = home team win; Yellow = draw; Red = away team win.

== Second round ==
=== Championship round ===
| Pos | Team | Pld | W | D | L | GF | GA | GD | Pts | Qualification |
|---|---|---|---|---|---|---|---|---|---|---|
| 1 | Sant Julià (C) | 20 | 16 | 2 | 2 | 84 | 15 | +69 | 50 | Qualification to Champions League first qualifying round |
| 2 | FC Santa Coloma | 20 | 15 | 3 | 2 | 75 | 12 | +63 | 48 | Qualification to Europa League second qualifying round (Note: FC Santa Coloma won 2009 Copa Constitució and therefore qualified for the second qualifying round of the UEFA Europa League.) |
| 3 | Principat | 20 | 10 | 1 | 9 | 38 | 47 | −9 | 31 | |
| 4 | Lusitanos | 20 | 10 | 0 | 10 | 39 | 30 | +9 | 30 | |

Source: RSSSF
Rules for classification: 1) points; 2) goal difference; 3) number of goals scored.
(C) Champions
Notes:

| Home \ Away | LUS | PRI | SFC | SJU |
|---|---|---|---|---|
| Lusitanos | | 1–2 | 0–2 | 0–1 |
| Principat | 2–1 | | 1–4 | 0–2 |
| FC Santa Coloma | 3–1 | 3–1 | | 3–1 |
| Sant Julià | 3–0 | 5–0 | 3–2 | |

Source: RSSSF
Legend: Blue = home team win; Yellow = draw; Red = away team win.

=== Relegation round ===
| Pos | Team | Pld | W | D | L | GF | GA | GD | Pts | Qualification or relegation |
|---|---|---|---|---|---|---|---|---|---|---|
| 5 | UE Santa Coloma | 20 | 12 | 3 | 5 | 65 | 31 | +34 | 39 | |
| 6 | Engordany | 20 | 7 | 0 | 13 | 39 | 88 | −49 | 21 | |
| 7 | Inter Club d'Escaldes (O) | 20 | 4 | 1 | 15 | 25 | 68 | −43 | 13 | Qualification to relegation play-offs |
| 8 | Rànger's (R) | 20 | 1 | 0 | 19 | 26 | 100 | −74 | 3 | Relegation to Segona Divisió |

Source: RSSSF
Rules for classification: 1) points; 2) goal difference; 3) number of goals scored.
(O) Play-off winners; (R) Relegated

| Home \ Away | ENG | INT | RAN | SUE |
|---|---|---|---|---|
| Engordany | | 4–2 | 4–0 | 2–3 |
| Inter Club d'Escaldes | 2–4 | | 4–2 | 1–5 |
| Rànger's | 0–4 | 2–4 | | 0–5 |
| UE Santa Coloma | 6–0 | 3–0 | 8–0 | |

Source: RSSSF
Legend: Blue = home team win; Yellow = draw; Red = away team win.

== Relegation play-offs ==
Inter Club d'Escaldes competed in a two-legged relegation play-off against Atlètic Club d'Escaldes, runners-up from Segona Divisió, for one spot in 2009–10 Primera Divisió. Inter successfully retained their Primera Divisió spot after winning on penalties 10–9.

17 May 2009
20:00 CEST

| Inter Club d'Escaldes | 2 – 1 | Atlètic Club d'Escaldes |

Estadi Comunal d'Aixovall, Aixovall

24 May 2009
18:00 CEST

| Atlètic Club d'Escaldes | 2 – 1 | Inter Club d'Escaldes |
Penalties
| | 9 – 10 |

Estadi Comunal d'Aixovall, Aixovall

Source: RSSSF
