= Copa Constitució =

Association football competition in Andorra

- Founded: 1991
- Region: Andorra
- Teams: 12
- Qualifier for: UEFA Europa Conference League
- Domestic cup: Andorran Supercup
- Current champions: Atlètic Club d'Escaldes (2nd title)
- Most championships: FC Santa Coloma (9 titles)
- 2026 Copa Constitució

The Copa Constitució or Andorran Cup, also known is Copa Constitució Valira Seguretat for sponsorship reasons, is the national football cup competition in Andorra organized by the Andorran Football Federation. The Cup annual tournament began in 1990. Since the 1994–95 season, the tournament has been affiliated with FIFA and UEFA.

== Champions ==
Season	Winner	Score	Runner-up
1991	FC Santa Coloma‡		
1992	Not Held		
1993	Not Held		
1994	CE Principat‡		
1995	CE Principat		
1996	CE Principat	2–0	FC Santa Coloma
1997	CE Principat	7–0	UE Sant Julià
1998	CE Principat	4–3	FC Santa Coloma
1999	CE Principat	3–1	FC Santa Coloma
2000	Constel·lació Esportiva	6–0	FC Encamp
2001	FC Santa Coloma	2–0	UE Sant Julià
2002	FC Lusitanos	2–0	Inter Escaldes
2003	FC Santa Coloma	5–3	UE Sant Julià
2004	FC Santa Coloma	1–0	UE Sant Julià
2005	FC Santa Coloma	2–1	UE Sant Julià
2006	FC Santa Coloma	1–1 (5–3 p)	FC Rànger's
2007	FC Santa Coloma	2–2 (4–2 p)	UE Sant Julià
2008	UE Sant Julià	6–1	FC Lusitanos
2009	FC Santa Coloma	6–1	FC Lusitanos
2010	UE Sant Julià	1–0	UE Santa Coloma
2011	UE Sant Julià	3–1	UE Santa Coloma
2012	FC Santa Coloma	1–0	FC Lusitanos
2013	UE Santa Coloma	3–2 (a.e.t.)	UE Sant Julià
2014	UE Sant Julià	2–1	FC Lusitanos
2015	UE Sant Julià	1–1 (5–4 p)	FC Santa Coloma
2016	UE Santa Coloma	3–0	UE Engordany
2017	UE Santa Coloma	1–0	FC Santa Coloma
2018	FC Santa Coloma	2–1	UE Sant Julià
2019	UE Engordany	2–0	FC Santa Coloma
2020	Inter Escaldes	2–0	FC Santa Coloma
2021	UE Sant Julià	2–1	Atlètic Club d'Escaldes
2022	Atlètic Club d'Escaldes	4–1	UE Extremenya
2023	Inter Escaldes	2–1	FC Santa Coloma
2024	UE Santa Coloma	1–0 (a.e.t.)	Pas de la Casa
2025	Inter Escaldes	1–0	Atlètic Club d'Escaldes
2026	Atlètic Club d'Escaldes	3–2	FC Santa Coloma

‡ Not official titles.

=== Performance by club ===
Club	Winners	Runners-up	Winning Years	Runner-up Years
FC Santa Coloma	9	9	2001, 2003, 2004, 2005, 2006, 2007, 2009, 2012, 2018	1996, 1998, 1999, 2015, 2017, 2019, 2020, 2023, 2026
UE Sant Julià	6	8	2008, 2010, 2011, 2014, 2015, 2021	1997, 2001, 2003, 2004, 2005, 2007, 2013, 2018
CE Principat	5	0	1995, 1996, 1997, 1998, 1999	–
UE Santa Coloma	4	2	2013, 2016, 2017, 2024	2010, 2011
Inter Escaldes	3	1	2020, 2023, 2025	2002
Atlètic Club d'Escaldes	2	2	2022, 2026	2021, 2025
FC Lusitanos	1	4	2002	2008, 2009, 2012, 2014
UE Engordany	1	1	2019	2016
Constel·lació Esportiva	1	0	2000	–
FC Encamp	0	1	–	2000
FC Rànger's	0	1	–	2006
UE Extremenya	0	1	–	2022
Pas de la Casa	0	1	–	2024
