= UE Santa Coloma =

Association football club in Andorra

- Full name: Unió Esportiva Santa Coloma
- Nicknames: UE; Esquirols (Squirrels); Groc-i-negres (Yellow and Black)
- Founded: 1986; 40 years ago
- Ground: Andorra Football Federation stadiums
- Chairman: Joan Antoni Antón
- Manager: Iñaki Alonso
- League: Primera Divisió
- 2025–26: Primera Divisió, 2nd of 10
- Website: www.uesantacoloma.com
Home colours	Away colours

Unió Esportiva Santa Coloma, also known as UE Santa Coloma, is an Andorran professional football club based in the village of Santa Coloma, Andorra la Vella. The club currently plays in Primera Divisió.

== History ==
=== Early years and rise to top-flight ===
UE Santa Coloma was founded on 23 September 1986 in the village of Santa Coloma. In 1996 the club established a football academy to give a qualitative leap in the field of sports in the country. During few seasons the club acted as farm team for many Andorran teams including FC Santa Coloma. The first football department team was refounded, after being inactive many years, in 2006 by joining the Andorran football league Segona Divisió the following year.

The team plays in the Primera Divisió, after winning the Segona Divisió in the 2007–08 season. The club made its first appearance in European competition in the 2010–11 UEFA Europa League after finishing second in the league in the 2009–10 season.

=== Rise to prominence ===
In 2013 the team won his first trophy in the Copa Constitució after defeating 3–2 Sant Julià in the average time. Three years later UE Santa Coloma was crowned again as Andorran's Cup winner after defeating 3-0 UE Engordany in 2016.

The club made history in the 2023–24 season as the club would win the league, cup, and supercup titles securing an historic domestic treble for the club. In the league, they would win their first title only recording 1 loss in the entire campaign and having a 3-point gap between then defending champions Inter Club d'Escaldes, in the cup, they would beat Pas de la Casa 1-0 on extra time, and in the supercup, they would beat Inter Club 2-1 in average time.

On 16 July 2024, the club earned their first win in European competition by beating FC Ballkani from Kosovo in the 2024–25 UEFA Champions League. On 14 August 2024, after losing their UEFA Europa League third qualifying round tie against FK RFS, they qualified for the play-off round of UEFA Conference League so they became the first ever Andorran side to reach the play-off stage of a UEFA club competition.

== Colours and badge ==
Yellow has been the traditional UE Santa Coloma color. Manly of the home kits alternate yellow and black. Even then in its beginnings the club dressed up the colors of the parish of Andorra la Vella, green and navy, and occasionally wearing an orange kit during some seasons.

Until 2013 the badge was representing Santa Coloma's pre-romanical church tower and the most traditional team icon, the squirrel. The nowadays crest still represent the icons of UE Santa Coloma, featuring the club colours (yellow and black) and the year of foundation (1986).

The club have an alternative badge (main crest during the first leg of the 2013–14 season) representing the Santa Coloma's squirrel and the colours of the Andorran nation with the motto's country "Virtus Unita Fortior".

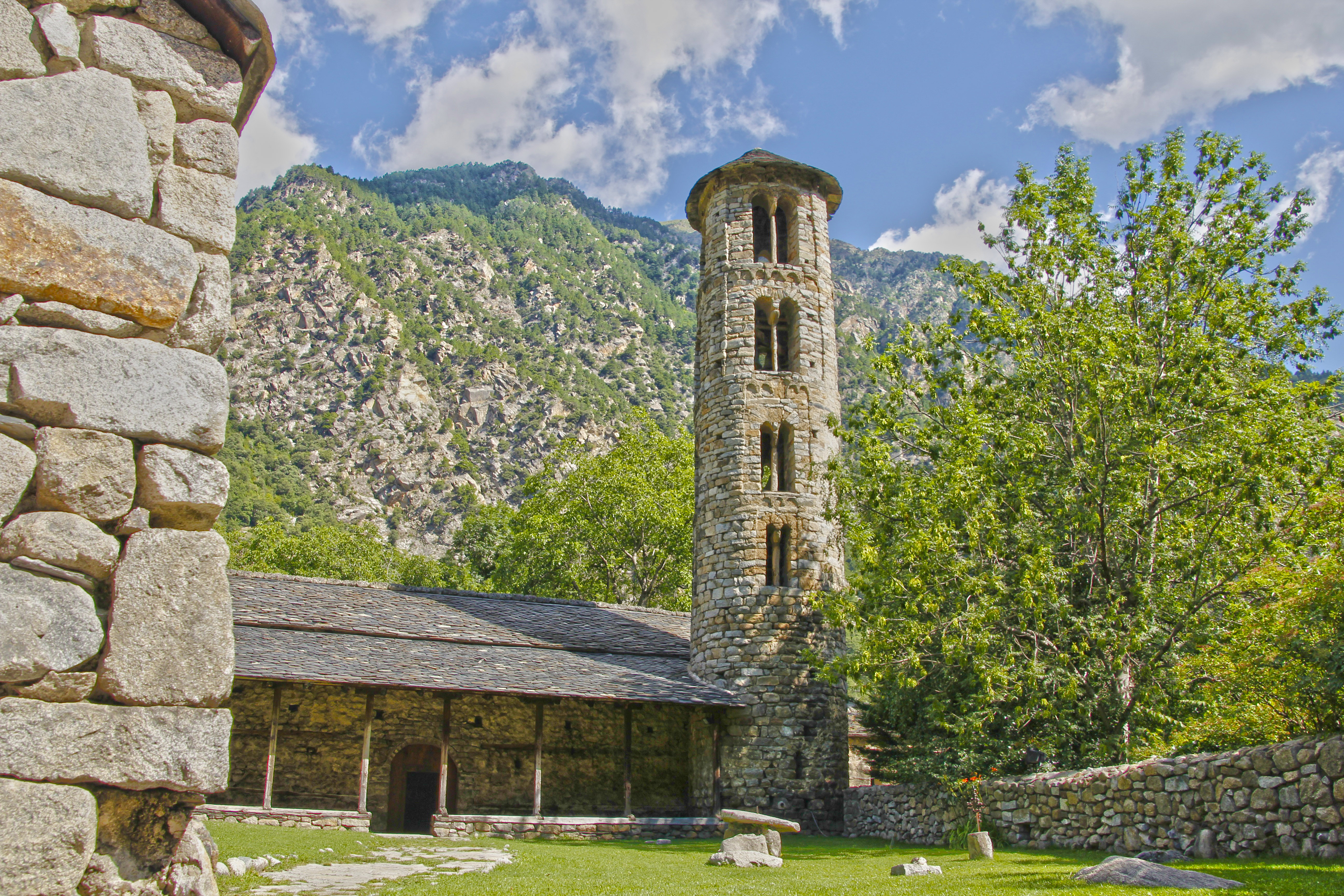
The Santa Coloma's church, a symbol of the club.

Old badge (until 2013).

Alternative badge.

Original first kit.
2013–14 home kit.
2014–16 home kit.

Period *	Kitmaker	Kit sponsor
2007–12	Joma	Escale
2012–18	Joma	Seguretat Sepir
2014–18	Luanvi	Seguretat Sepir
2018–present	Joma	None

* Since the Andorra Football Federation affiliation.

== Support ==
The club's nickname, as seen from the crest, is Esquirols (Squirrels) due to the number of the animals that live around the town of Santa Coloma. There is a long-standing tradition for a number of fans to wear squirrel costumes at the club's last home game of each season.

== Club rivalries ==
=== El Derbi Colomenc ===
The local rival of UE Santa Coloma is actually their neighbour's hometown football team FC Santa Coloma. The rivalry between these two teams has increased since the 2009/10 season when those teams were competing for winning the Premier Andorran League.

== Honours ==
- Primera Divisió:
  - Winners (1): 2023–24
  - Runners-up (2): 2009–10, 2013–14, 2021–22
- Copa Constitució:
  - Winners (4): 2013, 2016, 2017, 2024
  - Runners-up (2): 2010, 2011
- Supercopa Andorrana:
  - Winners (2): 2016, 2024
  - Runners-up (2): 2013, 2017
- Segona Divisió:
  - Winners (1): 2007–08

== League history ==
Season	Division	Pos.	Pl.	W	D	L	GS	GA	P
2007–08	Segona Divisió	1	16	14	2	0	66	11	44
2008–09	Primera Divisió	5	20	12	3	5	65	31	39
2009–10	Primera Divisió	2	20	13	4	3	50	26	43
2010–11	Primera Divisió	4	20	10	0	10	54	27	30
2011–12	Primera Divisió	3	20	10	7	3	61	20	37
2012–13	Primera Divisió	3	20	11	4	5	47	25	37
2013–14	Primera Divisió	2	20	12	3	5	40	24	39
2014–15	Primera Divisió	3	20	12	2	6	33	17	38
2015–16	Primera Divisió	4	20	8	6	6	34	20	30
2016–17	Primera Divisió	3	27	14	6	7	62	34	48
2017–18	Primera Divisió	5	27	12	5	10	53	29	41
2018–19	Primera Divisió	6	27	8	8	11	33	32	32
2019–20	Primera Divisió	5	24	11	6	7	34	26	39
2020–21	Primera Divisió	6	20	9	3	8	44	27	30
2021–22	Primera Divisió	2	27	13	8	6	37	26	47
2022–23	Primera Divisió	4	28	10	12	6	40	29	42
2023–24	Primera Divisió	1	27	20	6	1	57	12	66
2024–25	Primera Divisió	4	27	14	7	6	56	24	49

== European results ==
Season	Competition	Round	Club	Home	Away	Agg.
2010–11	2010–11 UEFA Europa League	1QR	(Montenegro) Mogren	0–3	0-2	0–5
2011–12	2011–12 UEFA Europa League	1QR	(Hungary) Paks	0–1	0-4	0–5
2012–13	2012–13 UEFA Europa League	1QR	(Netherlands) Twente	0–3	0-6	0–9
2013–14	2013–14 UEFA Europa League	1QR	(Bosnia and Herzegovina) Zrinjski Mostar	1–3	0-1	1–4
2014–15	2014–15 UEFA Europa League	1QR	(North Macedonia) Metalurg Skopje	0–3	0-2	0–5
2016–17	2016–17 UEFA Europa League	1QR	(Croatia) Lokomotiva Zagreb	1-3	1–4	2–7
2017–18	2017–18 UEFA Europa League	1QR	(Croatia) Osijek	0-2	0–4	0–6
2022-23	2022-23 UEFA Conference League	1QR	(Iceland) Breiðablik	0-1	1–4	1–5
2024-25	2024–25 UEFA Champions League	1QR	(Kosovo) Ballkani	1-2	2–1 (a.e.t.)	3–3 (6-5 p)
2024-25	2024–25 UEFA Champions League	2QR	(Denmark) Midtjylland	0-3	0–1	0–4
2024-25	2024–25 UEFA Europa League	3QR	(Latvia) RFS	0-2	0–7	0–9
2024-25	2024–25 UEFA Conference League	PO	(Iceland) Víkingur Reykjavík	0-0	0–5	0–5

Notes

- PR: Preliminary round
- QR: Qualifying round
- 1QR: First qualifying round
- 2QR: Second qualifying round
- 3QR: Third qualifying round
- PO: Playoff round

== Current squad ==
As of 6 April, 2026

Note: Flags indicate national team as defined under FIFA eligibility rules; some limited exceptions apply. Players may hold more than one non-FIFA nationality.

No.	Pos.	Nation	Player
1	GK	ESP	Marcos Olmo
2	DF	AND	Eric de Pablos
3	DF	ESP	Sergio Casta
4	DF	AND	Christian García
5	DF	BRA	Guilherme Quichini
6	MF	MAR	Youssef El Ghazoui
7	FW	AND	Àlex Martínez
8	MF	ESP	Álex Baldrich
9	FW	ESP	Fran Palma
14	DF	ESP	Fran Molina
15	DF	ESP	Ekaitz Jiménez
16	DF	AND	Marc Mateu

No.	Pos.	Nation	Player
17	FW	CPV	Rely Cabral
18	DF	ESP	Aritz Cuadrado
19	FW	ESP	Tato
20	DF	POR	Gonçalo Lixa
21	MF	ESP	Pablo Margallo
22	FW	ESP	Adrián Amorós
27	MF	FRA	Kylian Poumot
32	GK	ESP	Pol Freixanet
33	FW	ESP	David Martín
98	MF	ESP	Miguel López
99	FW	AND	Cucu
