= UE Sant Julià =

Association football club in Andorra

Sant Julià
- Full name: Unió Esportiva Sant Julià
- Nicknames: Lauredians; Santju/Sanju
- Founded: 1982; 44 years ago
- Ground: Andorra Football Federation stadiums
- Chairman: Albert Carnicé
- Head coach: Pablo Huerga
- League: Segona Divisió
- 2023–24: Primera Divisió, 8th ▼
Home colours	Away colours

Unió Esportiva Sant Julià, also known as UE Sant Julià, is an Andorran professional football club based in the parish of Sant Julià de Lòria. The club withdrew from competing in the 2023–24 Segona Divisió season.

== History ==
Founded in 1982 UE Sant Julià is the main football club of the Andorran Southern parish of Sant Julià de Lòria. The team have been playing in the top flight since the foundation of the Andorran Premier League in 1995. Since then UE Sant Julià have won the Andorran championship twice (2004–05 and 2008–09) and are five time Copa Constitució winners (2008, 2010, 2011, 2014 and 2015).

== UE Sant Julià in Europe ==
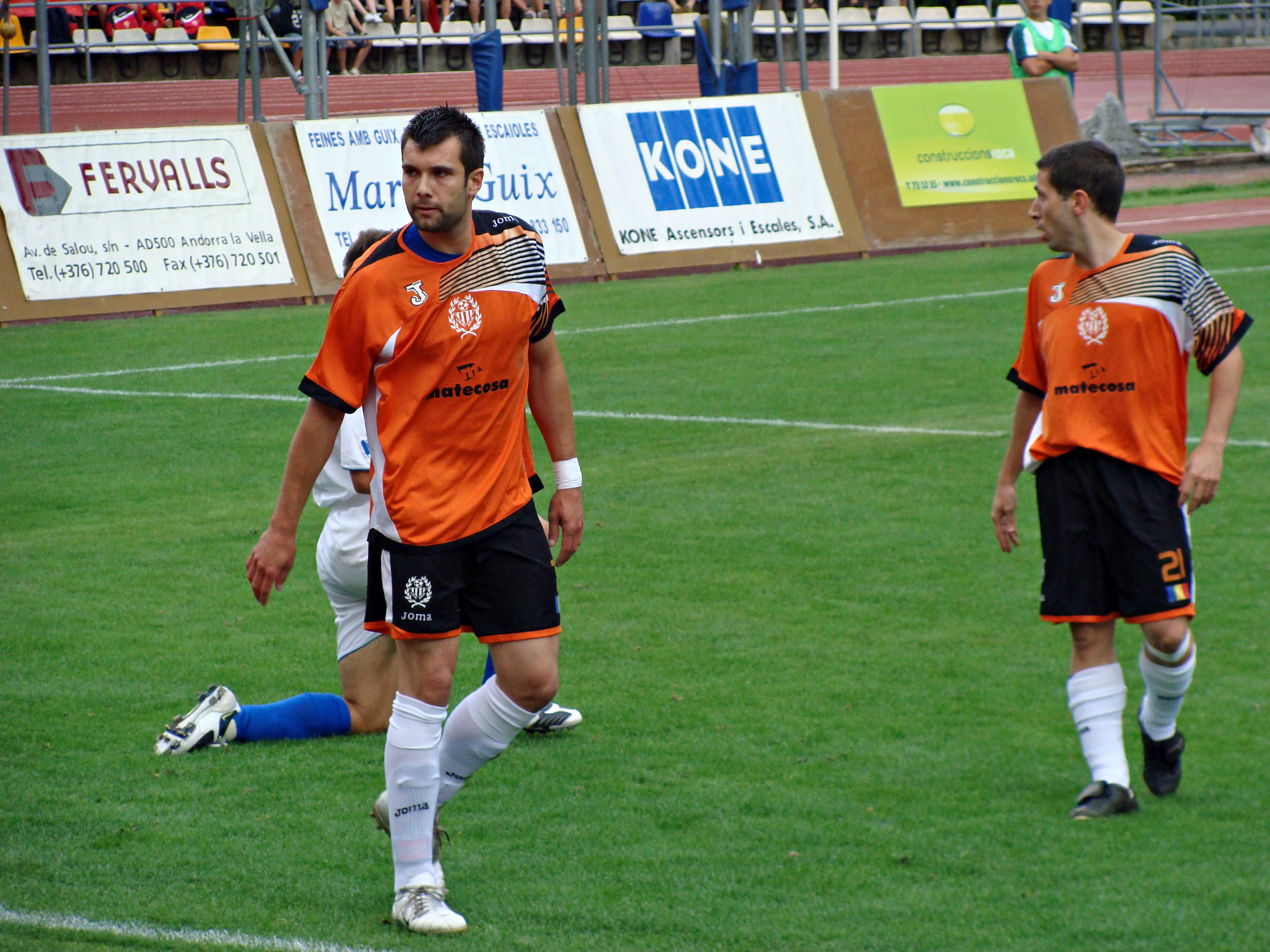
UE Sant Julià against S.P. Tre Fiori in 2009–10 UEFA Champions League.

The club has also appeared in European competitions several times. In the 2000–01 season they were eliminated in the first round of Intertoto Cup by the Swiss team, Lausanne-Sport (aggregate 1–9). They also participated in the Intertoto Cup in 2002–03 and drew 2–2 at home against Coleraine from Northern Ireland, but away from home lost 5–0 to be eliminated from the competition. They suffered an 8–0 defeat at home in the 2004–05 season of the Intertoto Cup against the Serbian team, FK Smederevo and also fell 3–0 in Serbia. In the first qualifying round for the UEFA Cup 2005–06 they lost to Romanian team, Rapid București (aggregate 0–10).

In the first round of the 2006–07 Intertoto Cup they lost to Maribor from Slovenia (aggregate 0–8). In the first round of the 2007–08 Intertoto Cup they lost to the Bosnian squad Slavija Sarajevo 3–2 in Andorra and 3–2 again in Bosnia-Herzegovina (aggregate 4–6). Sant Julià faced Cherno More of Bulgaria in the first qualifying round of the 2008–09 UEFA Cup. They lost 0–9 on aggregate.

For the 2009–10 season, Sant Julia once again drew a Bulgarian opponent, this time for UEFA Champions League qualification in the second round – Levski Sofia. Before meeting the champions of Bulgaria, Sant Julia eliminated Tre Fiori of San Marino after two 1–1 results, and a penalty shootout. This was the first European tie won by an Andorran football club in history.

Their dreams came to an end after a 4–0 defeat away at Sofia. The team still played well and managed to keep their goal clean for 49 minutes against the Bulgarian champion. Only 9 players from Aixovall exited the pitch after two Sant Julia players received red cards. They lost 0–5 in the return leg at home.

UE Sant Julià participated in the 2010–11 UEFA Europa League second qualifying round against MYPA and in 2011–12 against Bnei Yehuda, losing on aggregate 0–8 against the Finnish squad and 0–4 against the Israeli squad.

For the 2014–15 season UE Sant Julià returned to the European competitions playing the first round of the 2014–15 UEFA Europa League against the Serbian Čukarički team losing on aggregate 0–4. UE Sant Julià qualified for the 2015–16 European competitions the following season playing the first round of the 2015–16 UEFA Europa League against the Danish Randers FC team losing on aggregate 0–4.

UE Sant Julià qualified for European competitions in the 2017–18 and 2018–19 season, playing the first round of UEFA Europa League against KF Skënderbeu Korçë from Albania losing on aggregate 0–6, and the following season against Gżira United from Malta losing on aggregate 1–4.

== Colours and badge ==
Traditionally orange have been the home colours of UE Sant Julià and the main colour of the team, always referred to as l'equip taronja (the orange team) or el club taronja (the orange club), and supporters. Although some seasons the club have worn black and red/orange or all green kits in home matches.

The club crest is a variation of the coat of arms of Sant Julià de Lòria.

Coat of arms of Sant Julià de Lòria.

Traditional first kit.
First kit variation (until late 2000s).
Change kit black variation (until late 2000s).
Change kit black variation (2009–14).
Traditional all green kit.

Period *	Kitmaker	Kit sponsor
1994–08	Diadora	Matecosa
2008–12	Joma	Matecosa
2012–14	Elements	None
2014–15	Elements	Les Barques
2015–17	Pentex	Tic Tapa
2017–19	Hummel	Tic Tapa
2019–20	Joma	None
2020–present	Asioka	Olympus

* Since the Andorra Football Federation affiliation.

== Club rivalries ==
=== El Clàssic ===
The main rival of UE Sant Julià in Primera Divisió has been always FC Santa Coloma playing in a derby called El Clàssic. Both teams are strong in the Andorran Premier League and since the creation of the championship the clubs have been competing for being the champion of the top flight.

== Honours ==
Primera Divisió

- Winners (2): 2004–05, 2008–09
- Runners-up (7): 2000–01, 2001–02, 2003–04, 2005–06, 2007–08, 2010–11, 2016–17, 2018–19

Copa Constitució

- Winners (6): 2008, 2010, 2011, 2014, 2015, 2021
- Runners-up (8): 1997, 2001, 2003, 2004, 2005, 2007, 2013, 2018

Supercopa Andorrana

- Winners (6): 2004, 2009, 2010, 2011, 2014, 2018
- Runners-up (4): 2003, 2005, 2008, 2015

== League history ==
Season	Division	Pos.	Pl.	W	D	L	GS	GA	P
2011–12	Primera Divisió	4	20	10	6	4	57	22	36
2012–13	Primera Divisió	4	20	10	4	6	38	18	34
2013–14	Primera Divisió	3	20	11	5	4	46	19	38
2014–15	Primera Divisió	4	20	9	5	6	41	23	32
2015–16	Primera Divisió	3	20	9	5	6	41	20	32
2016–17	Primera Divisió	2	27	14	8	5	55	23	50
2017–18	Primera Divisió	3	27	14	6	7	64	24	48
2018–19	Primera Divisió	2	27	15	8	4	52	26	53

== European results ==
As of match played 15 July 2021.

Season	Competition	Round	Club	Home	Away	Agg.
2001–02	2001 UEFA Intertoto Cup	1R	(Switzerland) Lausanne-Sport	1–3	0–6	1–9
2002–03	2002 UEFA Intertoto Cup	1R	(Northern Ireland) Coleraine	2-2	0–5	2–7
2004–05	2004 UEFA Intertoto Cup	1R	(Serbia and Montenegro) Sartid	0–8	0–3	0–11
2005–06	2005–06 UEFA Cup	1QR	(Romania) Rapid București	0–5	0–5	0–10
2006–07	2006 UEFA Intertoto Cup	1R	(Slovenia) Maribor	0–3	0–5	0–8
2007–08	2007 UEFA Intertoto Cup	1R	(Bosnia and Herzegovina) Slavija Istočno Sarajevo	2–3	2–3	4–6
2008–09	2008–09 UEFA Cup	1QR	(Bulgaria) Cherno More	0–5	0–4	0–9
2009–10	2009–10 UEFA Champions League	1QR	(San Marino) Tre Fiori	1–1 (a.e.t.)	1-1	2–2 (5-4 p)
2009–10	2009–10 UEFA Champions League	2QR	(Bulgaria) Levski Sofia	0–5	0–4	0–9
2010–11	2010–11 UEFA Europa League	2QR	(Finland) MYPA	0–5	0–3	0–8
2011–12	2011–12 UEFA Europa League	2QR	(Israel) Bnei Yehuda	0–2	0–2	0–2
2014–15	2014–15 UEFA Europa League	1QR	(Serbia) Čukarički	0–0	0–4	0–4
2015–16	2015–16 UEFA Europa League	1QR	(Denmark) Randers	0–1	0–3	0–4
2017–18	2017–18 UEFA Europa League	1QR	(Albania) Skënderbeu	0–5	0–1	0–6
2018–19	2018-19 UEFA Europa League	PR	(Malta) Gżira United	0–2	1–2	1–4
2019–20	2019–20 UEFA Europa League	PR	(Gibraltar) Europa	3–2	0–4	3–6
2021–22	2021-22 UEFA Conference League	1QR	(Malta) Gżira United	0-0	1–1 (a.e.t.)	1–1 (3-5 p)

Notes

- PR: Preliminary round
- 1R: First round
- 1Q: First qualifying round
- 2Q: Second qualifying round
