= FC Santa Coloma =

Association football club in Andorra

Santa Coloma
- Full name: Fútbol Club Santa Coloma
- Nicknames: FCSC; Colomencs; Coloma (Dove); El Don (The Lord); The Blues
- Founded: 1986; 40 years ago
- Ground: Andorra Football Federation stadiums
- Chairman: Daniel Milstein
- Manager: Víctor Vázquez
- League: Primera Divisió
- 2025–26: Primera Divisió, 4th of 10
- Website: fclubsantacoloma.net
Home colours	Away colours

FC Santa Coloma is an Andorran professional football club based in Santa Coloma, parish of Andorra la Vella, that competes in the Primera Divisió. It is the most successful team in both Primera Divisió and Copa Constitució, having won both titles thirteen and ten times respectively.

== History ==
Fútbol Club Santa Coloma was founded in 1986 through the efforts of a group of football enthusiasts who represented the village of the same name that belongs to Andorra la Vella in the National Football Tournament (the former amateur league of Andorra). Later on FC Santa Coloma became one of the founder members of Primera Divisió in 1995. Since 2001 the club has enjoyed a great success in all Andorran competitions standing with all the records in the Premier Andorran League (13) and Andorran Cup (10).

At the end of 2017, the Spanish La Liga Villarreal CF team announced a collaboration agreement with the Andorran club at grassroots football level.

In July 2022, Gold Star Sports Management Group, led by Ukrainian-American entrepreneur, Daniel Milstein, completed the acquisition of the club. With Milstein as chairman, he announced Alex Lubyansky as CEO and Annabel Llevot as the General Manager. FC Santa Coloma and Gold Star FC Detroit are both under the Gold Star Football Club group of clubs.

== FC Santa Coloma in Europe ==
FC Santa Coloma has two unique achievements for an Andorran team in European competitions: it was both the first team from Andorra to win a match in any European competition and the first team from Andorra that did not concede a goal in a match in a European competition.

Both of these feats were achieved on three occasions: the first match in the 2007–08 UEFA Cup qualifying round against the Israeli side Maccabi Tel Aviv, in which FC Santa Coloma won 1–0 at home with a goal scored by Juli Fernandez, then in the 2014–15 UEFA Champions League First qualifying round when they beat Banants of Armenia 1–0, and in the 2018–19 UEFA Europa League Second qualifying, in which FC Santa Coloma won 1–0 at home against Valur of Iceland. On the first and last occasion, in the return leg they lost 4–0 to Maccabi and 3–0 to Valur, thus FC Santa Coloma were eliminated from the tournament.

Against Banants, they lost the second leg away in Armenia 3–2, however the game finished 3–3 on aggregate and FC Santa Coloma won by the away goals rule, thanks to a last minute goal by goalkeeper Eloy Casals. It was the second time an Andorran club won a two-legged tie in Europe after Sant Julià.

The 2023–24 season saw FC Santa Coloma claim another first - becoming the first Andorran team to navigate two European two-legged ties in the same season. Entering at the first qualifying round of the 2023–24 UEFA Europa Conference League, they eliminated Welsh club Penybont F.C., then Montenegrin club FK Sutjeska Nikšić, to reach the third qualifying round against Dutch club AZ.

== Colours and badge ==
FC Santa Coloma dressed in all white since the creation of the Andorran Premier League, alternating the home kit with red or blue. Traditionally, the away kit has been all blue and third kit all red. However the original first kit at the beginning of the foundation of the club was blue and gives the nickname of Blues. In the club crest feature the colours of Andorra and the Holy Dove that gives the name of the Santa Coloma d'Andorra town and therefore the name of the club.

Period	Manufacturer	Sponsor
1994–10	Joma	Don Pernil
2010–13	Joma	Pidasa
2013–15	Joma	None
2015–17	Joma	Don Denis
2017	Joma	Vall Banc

== Club rivalries ==
=== El Clàssic ===
The main rival of FC Santa Coloma in Primera Divisió has been always Sant Julià playing in a derby called El Clàssic. Both teams are strong in the Andorran Premier League and since the creation of the championship the clubs have been competing for being the champion of the top flight.

=== El Derbi Colomenc ===
The local rival of FC Santa Coloma is actually their neighbour's hometown football team UE Santa Coloma. The rivalry between these two teams has increased since the 2009/10 season when those teams were competing for winning the Premier Andorran League.

== Honours ==
- Primera Divisió:
  - Winners (13): 1994–95, 2000–01, 2002–03, 2003–04, 2007–08, 2009–10, 2010–11, 2013–14, 2014–15, 2015–16, 2016–17, 2017–18, 2018–19
  - Runners-up (8): 1997–98, 1998–99, 1999–00, 2006–07, 2008–09, 2011–12, 2012–13, 2019–20
- Copa Constitució:
  - Winners (10): 1991, 2001, 2003, 2004, 2005, 2006, 2007, 2009, 2012, 2018
  - Runners-up (8): 1996, 1998, 1999, 2015, 2017, 2019, 2020, 2023
- Supercopa Andorrana:
  - Winners (7): 2003, 2005, 2007, 2008, 2015, 2017, 2019
  - Runners-up (10): 2004, 2006, 2009, 2010, 2011, 2012, 2014, 2016, 2018, 2020

== League history ==
Season	Division	Pos.	Pl.	W	D	L	GS	GA	P
2011–12	Primera Divisió	2	20	11	5	4	56	17	38
2012–13	Primera Divisió	2	20	10	9	1	30	15	39
2013–14	Primera Divisió	1	20	13	3	4	50	12	42
2014–15	Primera Divisió	1	20	13	3	4	64	14	42
2015–16	Primera Divisió	1	20	14	5	1	44	8	47
2016–17	Primera Divisió	1	27	18	6	3	57	21	60
2017–18	Primera Divisió	1	27	18	4	5	62	20	58
2018–19	Primera Divisió	1	27	15	9	3	41	18	54
2019–20	Primera Divisió	2	24	15	7	3	48	12	51
2020–21	Primera Divisió	3	20	8	8	4	28	19	32
2021–22	Primera Divisió	5	27	15	7	5	64	34	52
2022–23	Primera Divisió	3	28	15	8	5	55	19	53
2023–24	Primera Divisió	4	27	19	2	6	64	23	59
2024–25	Primera Divisió	3	27	16	4	7	42	28	52

== European results ==
In 2014, Santa Coloma advanced for the first time in a knock-out round after beating FC Banants on the away goals rule. The deciding goal was scored by Coloma's goalkeeper in the 4th minute of added time.

Season	Competition	Round	Club	Home	Away	Agg.
2001–02	UEFA Cup	1QR	(Federal Republic of Yugoslavia) Partizan	0–1	1–7	1–8
2003–04	UEFA Cup	1QR	(Denmark) Esbjerg	1–4	0–5	1–9
2004–05	UEFA Cup	1QR	(Bosnia and Herzegovina) Modriča	0–1	0–3	0–4
2007–08	UEFA Cup	1QR	(Israel) Maccabi Tel Aviv	1–0	0–4	1–4
2008–09	UEFA Champions League	1QR	(Lithuania) Kaunas	1–4	1–3	2–7
2009–10	UEFA Europa League	2QR	(Switzerland) Basel	1–4	0–3	1–7
2010–11	UEFA Champions League	1QR	(Malta) Birkirkara	0–3	3–4	3–7
2011–12	UEFA Champions League	1QR	(Luxembourg) F91 Dudelange	0–2	0–2	0–4
2012–13	UEFA Europa League	1QR	(Croatia) Osijek	0–1	1–3	1–4
2013–14	UEFA Europa League	1QR	(Iceland) Breiðablik	0–0	0–4	0–4
2014–15	UEFA Champions League	1QR	(Armenia) Urartu	1–0	2–3	3–3 (a)
2014–15	UEFA Champions League	2QR	(Israel) Maccabi Tel Aviv	0–1	0–2	0–3
2015–16	UEFA Champions League	1QR	(Gibraltar) Lincoln Red Imps	1–2	0–0	1–2
2016–17	UEFA Champions League	1QR	(Armenia) Alashkert	0–0	0–3	0–3
2017–18	UEFA Champions League	1QR	(Armenia) Alashkert	1–1	0–1	1–2
2018–19	UEFA Champions League	PR	(Kosovo) Drita	0–2 (a.e.t.)		
2018–19	UEFA Europa League	2QR	(Iceland) Valur	1–0	0–3	1–3
2019–20	UEFA Champions League	PR	(San Marino) Tre Penne	1–0		
2019–20	UEFA Champions League	PR	(Kosovo) Feronikeli	1–2		
2019–20	UEFA Europa League	2QR	(Kazakhstan) Astana	0–0	1–4	1–4
2020–21	UEFA Europa League	PR	(Montenegro) Iskra Danilovgrad	0–0 (a.e.t.) (3–4 p)		
2021–22	UEFA Conference League	1QR	(Gibraltar) Mons Calpe	4–0	1–1	5–1
2021–22	UEFA Conference League	2QR	(Scotland) Hibernian	1–2	0–3	1–5
2023–24	UEFA Conference League	1QR	(Wales) Penybont	2–0 (a.e.t.)	1–1	3–1
2023–24	UEFA Conference League	2QR	(Montenegro) Sutjeska Nikšić	3–0 (a.e.t.)	0–2	3–2
2023–24	UEFA Conference League	3QR	(Netherlands) AZ	0–1	0–2	0–3
2025–26	UEFA Conference League	1QR	(Bosnia and Herzegovina) Borac Banja Luka	0–2	4–1	4–3
2025–26	UEFA Conference League	2QR	(Ukraine) Polissya Zhytomyr	1–4	2–1	3–5
2026–27	UEFA Conference League	1QR	(Wales) Penybont	3–0	1–0	4–0
2026–27	UEFA Conference League	2QR	(Austria) Rapid Wien	1–3	2–6	3–9

1. Match originally postponed due to bad pitch conditions caused by heavy rain. FC Santa Coloma suggested an alternative on 30 June, but UEFA awarded Birkirkara a 3–0 away win on 1 July.

Notes

- PR: Preliminary round
- QR: Qualifying round
- 1Q: First qualifying round
- 2Q: Second qualifying round

== Current squad ==
As of 5 September 2026

Note: Flags indicate national team as defined under FIFA eligibility rules; some limited exceptions apply. Players may hold more than one non-FIFA nationality.

No.	Pos.	Nation	Player
1	GK	AND	Mauro Rabelo
2	DF	ESP	Álex Rasines
4	DF	ESP	Guti
5	DF	ESP	Joel Armengol
6	MF	ESP	Miguel López
7	FW	ESP	Jesús Ares
8	MF	ESP	Iñigo Barrenetxea
9	FW	ESP	Pedja Muñoz
10	FW	AND	Guillaume López
11	MF	ESP	Roberto Abreu
13	GK	ESP	Gorka San Nicolás

No.	Pos.	Nation	Player
14	FW	CPV	Rely Cabral
15	MF	ESP	Arnau Serrano
16	DF	MEX	David Andrade
17	FW	COL	Juan Camilo Becerra
18	MF	ESP	Adrià Arjona
21	DF	ESP	Gerard Gómez
22	FW	ESP	Álex Gómez
23	DF	AND	Moisés San Nicolás
27	DF	ESP	David Rodríguez
31	GK	ESP	Jan Lagunas
92	FW	CGO	Oyeli Nguesso

== Managers ==
- (Spain) Santos Ilatigo (2006–07)
- (Spain) Xavier Roura (2007)
- (Andorra) Vicens Marques (2008–10)
- (Spain) Xavier Roura (2010–11)
- (Spain) Luis Blanco Torrado (2011–13)
- (Andorra) Richard Imbernón (2013–18)
- (Spain) Marc Rodríguez (2018–20)
- (Spain) Albert Jorquera (2020–)
