= 2010–11 UEFA Europa League =

40th season of Europe's secondary club football tournament organised by UEFA

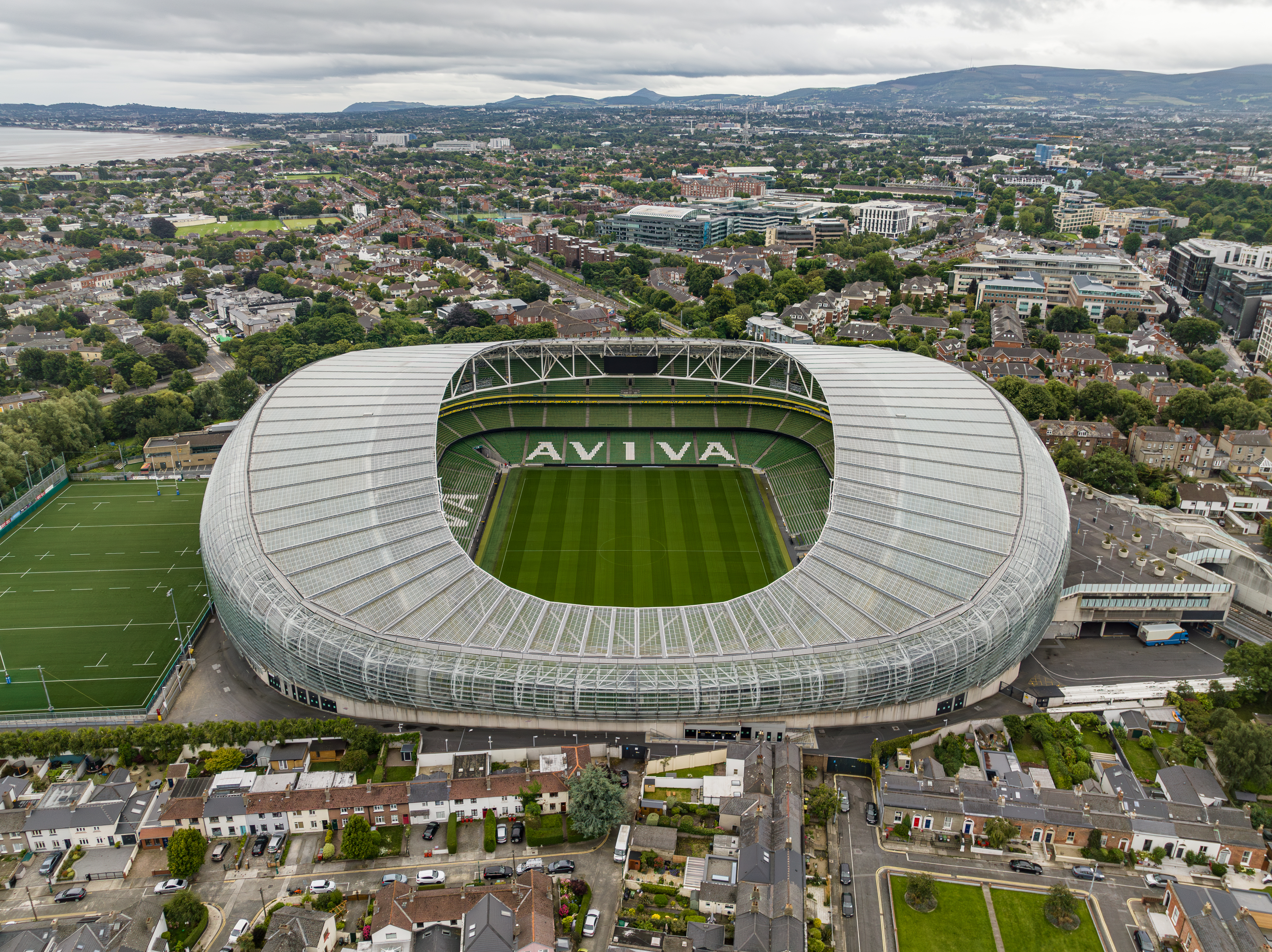
- The Aviva Stadium in Dublin hosted the final

Tournament details
- Dates: 16 September 2010 – 18 May 2011 (competition proper); 1 July – 26 August 2010 (qualifying)
- Teams: 48+8 (competition proper); 161+33 (total) (from 53 associations)

Final positions
- Champions: (Portugal) Porto (2nd title)
- Runners-up: (Portugal) Braga

Tournament statistics
- Matches played: 205
- Goals scored: 551 (2.69 per match)
- Top scorer(s): Radamel Falcao (Porto); 17 goals

The 2010–11 UEFA Europa League was the second season of the UEFA Europa League, Europe's secondary club football tournament organised by UEFA, and the 40th edition overall including its predecessor, the UEFA Cup. It began on 1 July 2010, with the first qualifying round matches, and concluded on 18 May 2011, with the final at the Aviva Stadium in Dublin, Ireland, between Porto and first-time finalists Braga. This was the first all-Portuguese final of a European competition and only the third time that two Portuguese teams faced each other in Europe, following Braga's elimination of Benfica in the semi-finals. Porto defeated Braga 1–0, with a goal from the competition's top goalscorer Radamel Falcao, and won their second title in the competition, after victory in the 2002–03 UEFA Cup. Atletico Madrid were the defending champions but were eliminated in group stage.

== Association team allocation ==
A total of 194 teams from 53 UEFA associations participated in the 2010–11 UEFA Europa League. Associations were allocated places according to their 2009 UEFA country coefficient, which took into account their performance in European competitions from 2004–05 to 2008–09.

Below is the qualification scheme for the 2010–11 UEFA Europa League:

- Associations 1–6 each have three teams qualify
- Associations 7–9 each have four teams qualify
- Associations 10–51 each have three teams qualify, except Liechtenstein, which have one team qualify (as Liechtenstein only have a domestic cup and no domestic league)
- Associations 52–53 each have two teams qualify (an increase from only one team in the previous season)
- The top three associations of the 2009–10 UEFA Fair Play ranking each gain an additional berth
- Moreover, 33 teams eliminated from the 2010–11 UEFA Champions League are transferred to the Europa League.

=== Association ranking ===
Rank	Association	Coeff.	Teams	Notes
1	England	79.499	3	
2	Spain	74.266	3	+1(UCL)
3	Italy	62.910	3	+1(UCL)
4	Germany	56.695	3	
5	France	50.168	3	
6	Russia	47.625	3	+3(UCL)
7	Ukraine	41.850	4	+1(UCL)
8	Netherlands	39.130	4	+2(UCL)
9	Romania	38.908	4	+1(UCL)
10	Portugal	36.462	3	+2(UCL)
11	Turkey	32.225	3	+1(UCL)
12	Greece	28.165	3	+1(UCL)
13	Scotland	27.875	3	+2(UCL)
14	Belgium	25.325	3	+2(UCL)
15	Switzerland	25.250	3	+2(UCL)
16	Denmark	24.450	3	+1(FP)
17	Bulgaria	21.250	3	+1(UCL)
18	Czech Republic	20.750	3	+1(UCL)

Rank	Association	Coeff.	Teams	Notes
19	Norway	18.800	3	+1(UCL)
20	Austria	17.825	3	+1(UCL)
21	Serbia	15.250	3	
22	Israel	15.250	3	
23	Cyprus	15.082	3	+1(UCL)
24	Sweden	14.691	3	+1(FP) +1(UCL)
25	Slovakia	14.665	3	
26	Poland	12.916	3	+1(UCL)
27	Croatia	12.332	3	+1(UCL)
28	Finland	9.790	3	+1(FP) +1(UCL)
29	Lithuania	9.666	3	
30	Republic of Ireland	9.499	3	
31	Latvia	9.164	3	
32	Slovenia	9.082	3	
33	Belarus	8.666	3	+1(UCL)
34	Bosnia and Herzegovina	8.665	3	
35	Hungary	8.166	3	+1(UCL)
36	Iceland	6.665	3	

Rank	Association	Coeff.	Teams	Notes
37	Moldova	6.665	3	+1(UCL)
38	Georgia	6.664	3	
39	Liechtenstein	5.500	1	
40	Macedonia	5.165	3	
41	Azerbaijan	4.498	3	
42	Estonia	4.332	3	
43	Albania	3.999	3	
44	Kazakhstan	3.249	3	+1(UCL)
45	Armenia	2.999	3	
46	Wales	2.331	3	+1(UCL)
47	Northern Ireland	2.165	3	
48	Faroe Islands	2.165	3	
49	Luxembourg	1.332	3	
50	Montenegro	1.000	3	
51	Andorra	0.500	3	
52	Malta	0.499	2	
53	San Marino	0.250	2	

Notes

- (FP): Additional fair play berth (Sweden, Denmark, Finland)
- (UCL): Additional teams transferred from the UEFA Champions League

=== Distribution ===
The winners of the 2009–10 UEFA Europa League, Atlético Madrid, were guaranteed a place in the group stage as the title holder, since they did not qualify for the 2010–11 UEFA Champions League. However, they also qualified for the Europa League third qualifying round through domestic performance, as they were the runners-up of the 2009–10 Copa del Rey to Champions League-qualified Sevilla. As a result, this place in the third qualifying round was vacated, which in turn led to the following changes to the default allocation system in order to compensate for this vacant spot:

- The domestic cup winners of association 28 (Finland) have been promoted from the second qualifying round to the third qualifying round.
- The domestic cup winners of associations 52 and 53 (Malta and San Marino) have been promoted from the first qualifying to the second qualifying round.

	Teams entering in this round	Teams advancing from previous round	Teams transferred from Champions League
First qualifying round (52 teams)	20 domestic league runners-up from associations 33–53 (except Liechtenstein); 29 domestic league third-placed teams from associations 22–51 (except Liechtenstein); 3 teams which qualified via Fair Play rankings		
Second qualifying round (80 teams)	25 domestic cup winners from associations 29–53; 14 domestic league runners-up from associations 19–32; 6 domestic league third-placed teams from associations 16–21; 6 domestic league fourth-placed teams from associations 10–15; 3 domestic league fifth-placed teams from associations 7–9	26 winners from the first qualifying round	
Third qualifying round (70 teams)	13 domestic cup winners from associations 16–28; 3 domestic league runners-up from associations 16–18; 6 domestic league third-placed teams from associations 10–15; 3 domestic league fourth-placed teams from associations 7–9; 3 domestic league fifth-placed teams from associations 4–6 (League Cup winners for France); 2 domestic league sixth-placed teams from associations 1–3 (League Cup winners for England) (minus the spot vacated by Atlético Madrid)	40 winners from the second qualifying round	
Play-off round (74 teams)	15 domestic cup winners from associations 1–15; 3 domestic league third-placed teams from associations 7–9; 3 domestic league fourth-placed teams from associations 4–6; 3 domestic league fifth-placed teams from associations 1–3	35 winners from the third qualifying round	15 losers from the Champions League third qualifying round
Group stage (48 teams)	Title holder	37 winners from the play-off round	10 losers from the Champions League play-off round
Knockout phase (32 teams)		12 group winners from the group stage; 12 group runners-up from the group stage	8 third-placed teams from the Champions League group stage

=== Redistribution rules ===
A Europa League place is vacated when a team qualifies for both the Champions League and the Europa League, or qualifies for the Europa League by more than one method. When a place is vacated, it is redistributed within the national association by the following rules:

- When the domestic cup winners (considered as the "highest-placed" qualifiers within the national association) also qualify for the Champions League, their Europa League place is vacated, and the remaining Europa League qualifiers are moved up one place, with the final place (with the earliest starting round) taken by the domestic cup runners-up, provided they do not already qualify for the Champions League or the Europa League. Otherwise, this place is taken by the highest-placed league finishers that have not yet qualified for the Europa League.
- When the domestic cup winners also qualify for the Europa League through league position, their place through the league position is vacated, and the Europa League qualifiers that finish lower in the league are moved up one place, with the final place taken by the highest-placed league finishers that have not yet qualified for the Europa League.
- A place vacated by the League Cup winners is taken by the highest-placed league finishers that have not yet qualified for the Europa League.
- A Fair Play place is taken by the highest-ranked team in the domestic Fair Play table that has not yet qualified for the Champions League or the Europa League.

=== Teams ===
The labels in the parentheses show how each team qualified for the place of its starting round:

- TH: Title holders
- CW: Cup winners
- CR: Cup runners-up
- LC: League Cup winners
- Nth: League position
- P-W: End-of-season European competition play-offs winners
- FP: Fair play
- UCL: Relegated from the Champions League
  - GS: Third-placed teams from the group stage
  - PO: Losers from the play-off round
  - Q3: Losers from the third qualifying round

Round of 32
(Netherlands) Twente (UCL GS)	(Portugal) Benfica (UCL GS)	(Scotland) Rangers (UCL GS)	(Russia) Rubin Kazan (UCL GS)
(Switzerland) Basel (UCL GS)	(Russia) Spartak Moscow (UCL GS)	(Netherlands) Ajax (UCL GS)	(Portugal) Braga (UCL GS)
Group stage
(Spain) Atlético Madrid (TH)	(Belgium) Anderlecht (UCL PO)	(Norway) Rosenborg (UCL PO)	(Russia) Zenit Saint Petersburg (UCL PO)
(Austria) Red Bull Salzburg (UCL PO)	(Spain) Sevilla (UCL PO)	(Czech Republic) Sparta Prague (UCL PO)	(Ukraine) Dynamo Kyiv (UCL PO)
(Moldova) Sheriff Tiraspol (UCL PO)	(Italy) Sampdoria (UCL PO)	(Switzerland) Young Boys (UCL PO)	
Play-off round
(England) Manchester City (5th)	(Russia) Lokomotiv Moscow (4th)	(Greece) AEK Athens (3rd)	(Romania) Unirea Urziceni (UCL Q3)
(England) Aston Villa (6th)	(Russia) CSKA Moscow (5th)	(Scotland) Dundee United (CW)	(Croatia) Dinamo Zagreb (UCL Q3)
(Spain) Getafe (6th)	(Ukraine) Tavriya Simferopol (CW)	(Belgium) Club Brugge (3rd)	(Sweden) AIK (UCL Q3)
(Spain) Villarreal (7th)	(Ukraine) Metalist Kharkiv (3rd)	(Switzerland) Grasshopper (3rd)	(Greece) PAOK (UCL Q3)
(Italy) Palermo (5th)	(Netherlands) PSV Eindhoven (3rd)	(Kazakhstan) Aktobe (UCL Q3)	(Scotland) Celtic (UCL Q3)
(Italy) Napoli (6th)	(Netherlands) Feyenoord (4th)	(Finland) HJK (UCL Q3)	(Turkey) Fenerbahçe (UCL Q3)
(Germany) Bayer Leverkusen (4th)	(Romania) Vaslui (3rd)	(Wales) The New Saints (UCL Q3)	(Belgium) Gent (UCL Q3)
(Germany) Borussia Dortmund (5th)	(Romania) Steaua București (4th)	(Bulgaria) Litex Lovech (UCL Q3)	(Cyprus) Omonia (UCL Q3)
(France) Paris Saint-Germain (CW)	(Portugal) Porto (CW)	(Belarus) BATE Borisov (UCL Q3)	(Poland) Lech Poznań (UCL Q3)
(France) Lille (4th)	(Turkey) Trabzonspor (CW)	(Hungary) Debrecen (UCL Q3)	
Third qualifying round
(England) Liverpool (7th)	(Portugal) Sporting CP (4th)	(Bulgaria) Beroe Stara Zagora (CW)	(Cyprus) Apollon Limassol (CW)
(Italy) Juventus (7th)	(Turkey) Galatasaray (3rd)	(Bulgaria) CSKA Sofia (2nd)	(Sweden) IFK Göteborg (2nd)
(Germany) VfB Stuttgart (6th)	(Greece) Aris (4th)	(Czech Republic) Viktoria Plzeň (CW)	(Slovakia) Slovan Bratislava (CW)
(France) Montpellier (5th)	(Scotland) Hibernian (4th)	(Czech Republic) Jablonec (2nd)	(Poland) Jagiellonia Białystok (CW)
(Russia) Sibir Novosibirsk (CR)	(Belgium) Genk (P-W)	(Norway) Aalesund (CW)	(Croatia) Hajduk Split (CW)
(Ukraine) Dnipro Dnipropetrovsk (4th)	(Switzerland) Luzern (4th)	(Austria) Sturm Graz (CW)	(Finland) Inter Turku (CW)
(Netherlands) AZ (5th)	(Denmark) Nordsjælland (CW)	(Serbia) Red Star Belgrade (CW)	
(Romania) Timișoara (5th)	(Denmark) Odense (2nd)	(Israel) Maccabi Haifa (2nd)	
Second qualifying round
(Ukraine) Karpaty Lviv (5th)	Austria Wien (2nd)	(Republic of Ireland) Shamrock Rovers (2nd)	(Estonia) Sillamäe Kalev (2nd)
(Netherlands) Utrecht (P-W)	(Austria) Rapid Wien (3rd)	(Latvia) Jelgava (CW)	(Albania) Besa (CW)
(Romania) Dinamo București (6th)	(Serbia) OFK Beograd (3rd)	(Latvia) Ventspils (2nd)	(Kazakhstan) Atyrau (CW)
(Portugal) Marítimo (5th)	(Serbia) Spartak Zlatibor Voda (4th)	(Slovenia) Maribor (CW)	(Armenia) Mika (2nd)
(Turkey) Beşiktaş (4th)	(Israel) Maccabi Tel Aviv (3rd)	(Slovenia) HIT Gorica (3rd)	(Wales) Bangor City (CW)
(Greece) Olympiacos (5th)	(Cyprus) APOEL (2nd)	(Belarus) Dinamo Minsk (2nd)	(Northern Ireland) Cliftonville (2nd)
(Scotland) Motherwell (5th)	(Sweden) IF Elfsborg (3rd)	(Bosnia and Herzegovina) Borac Banja Luka (CW)	(Faroe Islands) Víkingur Gøta (CW)
(Belgium) Cercle Brugge (CR)	(Slovakia) Dukla Banská Bystrica (3rd)	(Hungary) Videoton (2nd)	(Luxembourg) Differdange 03 (CW)
(Switzerland) Lausanne-Sport (CR)	(Poland) Wisła Kraków (2nd)	(Iceland) Breiðablik (CW)	(Montenegro) Budućnost Podgorica (2nd)
(Denmark) Brøndby (3rd)	(Croatia) Cibalia (3rd)	(Moldova) Iskra-Stal (2nd)	(Andorra) Sant Julià (CW)
(Bulgaria) Levski Sofia (3rd)	(Finland) Honka (2nd)	(Georgia (country)) WIT Georgia (CW)	(Malta) Valletta (CW)
(Czech Republic) Baník Ostrava (3rd)	(Lithuania) Sūduva (3rd)	(Liechtenstein) Vaduz (CW)	(San Marino) Tre Penne (2nd)
(Norway) Molde (2nd)	(Lithuania) Šiauliai (4th)	(North Macedonia) Teteks (CW)	
(Norway) Stabæk (3rd)	(Republic of Ireland) Sporting Fingal (CW)	(Azerbaijan) Baku (CW)	
First qualifying round
(Israel) Bnei Yehuda (CR)	(Bosnia and Herzegovina) Široki Brijeg (2nd)	(Azerbaijan) Khazar Lankaran (4th)	(Faroe Islands) EB/Streymur (2nd)
(Cyprus) Anorthosis Famagusta (3rd)	(Bosnia and Herzegovina) Zrinjski Mostar (4th)	(Estonia) Narva Trans (3rd)	(Faroe Islands) NSÍ (4th)
(Sweden) Kalmar FF (4th)	(Hungary) Győri ETO (3rd)	(Estonia) Flora (CR)	(Luxembourg) F91 Dudelange (2nd)
(Slovakia) Nitra (4th)	(Hungary) Zalaegerszeg (CR)	(Albania) Tirana (3rd)	(Luxembourg) Grevenmacher (3rd)
(Poland) Ruch Chorzów (3rd)	(Iceland) KR (2nd)	(Albania) Laçi (4th)	(Montenegro) Mogren (3rd)
(Croatia) Šibenik (4th)	(Iceland) Fylkir (3rd)	(Kazakhstan) Shakhter Karagandy (3rd)	(Montenegro) Zeta (4th)
(Finland) TPS (3rd)	(Moldova) Olimpia Bălți (3rd)	(Kazakhstan) Tobol (4th)	(Andorra) UE Santa Coloma (2nd)
(Lithuania) Tauras Tauragė (5th)	(Moldova) Dacia Chișinău (CR)	(Armenia) Ulisses (3rd)	(Andorra) Lusitanos (4th)
(Republic of Ireland) Dundalk (5th)	(Georgia (country)) Dinamo Tbilisi (2nd)	(Armenia) Banants (CR)	(Malta) Sliema Wanderers (3rd)
(Latvia) Skonto (3rd)	(Georgia (country)) Zestaponi (3rd)	(Wales) Llanelli (2nd)	(San Marino) Faetano (3rd)
(Slovenia) Olimpija Ljubljana (4th)	(North Macedonia) Rabotnicki (2nd)	(Wales) Port Talbot Town (3rd)	(Sweden) Gefle IF (FP)
(Belarus) Dnepr Mogilev (3rd)	(North Macedonia) Metalurg Skopje (3rd)	(Northern Ireland) Glentoran (3rd)	(Denmark) Randers (FP)
(Belarus) Torpedo Zhodino (CR)	(Azerbaijan) Qarabağ (3rd)	(Northern Ireland) Portadown (CR)	(Finland) MYPA (FP)

1. England (ENG): Portsmouth, the runners-up of the 2009–10 FA Cup to Champions League-qualified Chelsea, did not obtain a UEFA licence, meaning they could not qualify for Europe. Portsmouth had appealed to UEFA, the Premier League and the English FA, but the latter two would not allow late applications for the licence. As a result, the seventh-placed team of the 2009–10 Premier League, Liverpool, claimed the Europa League spot in the third qualifying round.
2. Republic of Ireland (IRL): Since the third- and fourth-placed teams of the 2009 League of Ireland, Cork City and Derry City, were dissolved and expelled from the league respectively after the season was completed, the fifth-placed team, Dundalk, claimed the Europa League spot in the first qualifying round.
3. Lithuania (LTU): Vėtra, the runners-up of the 2009 A Lyga and also the runners-up of the 2009–10 Lithuanian Football Cup to Champions League-qualified Ekranas, were denied the UEFA licence for the 2010–11 season and therefore could not represent Lithuania in the UEFA Europa League. As a result, all Europa League spots were awarded to teams based on their league positions. Therefore, the fourth-placed team, Šiauliai, were moved from the first qualifying round to the second qualifying round, while the fifth-placed team, Tauras Tauragė, claimed the Europa League spot in the first qualifying round.
4. Spain (ESP): Mallorca, the fifth-placed team of the 2009–10 La Liga, were not admitted to the UEFA Europa League due to being immersed in a creditor contest (not by reason of having debt) a situation that does not meet the necessary admission criteria for participating in the UEFA competitions. As a result, the seventh-placed team, Villarreal, claimed the Europa League spot in the play-off round. On 30 July, UEFA's Appeals Body dismissed Mallorca's appeal against the infraction.

== Round and draw dates ==
All draws held at UEFA headquarters in Nyon, Switzerland unless stated otherwise.

Phase	Round	Draw date	First leg	Second leg
Qualifying	First qualifying round	21 June 2010	1 July 2010	8 July 2010
Qualifying	Second qualifying round	21 June 2010	15 July 2010	22 July 2010
Qualifying	Third qualifying round	16 July 2010	29 July 2010	5 August 2010
Play-off	Play-off round	6 August 2010	19 August 2010	26 August 2010
Group stage	Matchday 1	27 August 2010 (Monaco)	16 September 2010	
Group stage	Matchday 2	27 August 2010 (Monaco)	30 September 2010	
Group stage	Matchday 3	27 August 2010 (Monaco)	21 October 2010	
Group stage	Matchday 4	27 August 2010 (Monaco)	4 November 2010	
Group stage	Matchday 5	27 August 2010 (Monaco)	1–2 December 2010	
Group stage	Matchday 6	27 August 2010 (Monaco)	15–16 December 2010	
Knockout phase	Round of 32	17 December 2010	17 February 2011	24 February 2011
Knockout phase	Round of 16	17 December 2010	10 March 2011	17 March 2011
Knockout phase	Quarter-finals	18 March 2011	7 April 2011	14 April 2011
Knockout phase	Semi-finals	18 March 2011	28 April 2011	5 May 2011
Knockout phase	Final	18 March 2011	18 May 2011 at Aviva Stadium, Dublin	

Matches in the qualifying, play-off, and knockout rounds may also be played on Tuesdays or Wednesdays instead of the regular Thursdays due to scheduling conflicts.

== Seeding ==
The draws for the qualifying rounds, the play-off round and the group stage are all seeded based on the 2010 UEFA club coefficients. The coefficients are calculated on the basis of a combination of 20% of the value of the respective national association's coefficient for the period from 2005–06 to 2009–10 inclusive and the clubs' individual performances in the UEFA club competitions during the same period. Clubs are ordered by their coefficients and then divided into pots as required.

In the draws for the qualifying rounds and the play-off round, the teams are divided evenly into one seeded and one unseeded pot, based on their club coefficients. A seeded team is drawn against an unseeded team, with the order of legs in each tie also being decided randomly. Due to the limited time between matches, the draws for the second and third qualifying rounds take place before the results of the previous round are known. The seeding in each draw is carried out under the assumption that all of the highest-ranked clubs of the previous round are victorious. If a lower-ranked club is victorious, it simply takes the place of its defeated opponent in the next round. Prior to these draws, UEFA may form "groups" in accordance with the principles set by the Club Competitions Committee, but they are purely for convenience of the draw and do not resemble any real groupings in the sense of the competition, while ensuring that teams from the same association not drawn against each other.

In the draw for the group stage, the 48 teams are split into four pots of twelve teams, based on their club coefficients, with the title holder (if participating) automatically placed into Pot 1. Each group contains one team from each pot, but teams from the same association cannot be drawn into the same group.

In the draw for the first knockout stage, the twelve group winners and the four better third-placed teams from the Champions League group stage (based on their match record in the group stage) are seeded, and the twelve group runners-up and the other four third-placed teams from the Champions League group stage are unseeded. A seeded team is drawn against an unseeded team, with the seeded team hosting the second leg. Teams from the same group or the same association cannot be drawn against each other.

In the draws for the round of 16 onwards, there are no seedings, and teams from the same group or the same association may be drawn with each other.

== Qualifying rounds ==
In the qualifying and play-off rounds, teams play against each other over two legs on a home-and-away basis.

The draw for the first two qualifying rounds was made on 21 June 2010, while the draw for the third qualifying round was made on 16 July 2010.

=== First qualifying round ===
The first legs were played on 1 July, and the second legs were played on 8 July 2010.

Team 1	Agg.	Team 2	1st leg	2nd leg
UE Santa Coloma (Andorra)	0–5	(Montenegro) Mogren	0–3	0–2
Olimpija Ljubljana (Slovenia)	0–5	(Bosnia and Herzegovina) Široki Brijeg	0–2	0–3
Anorthosis Famagusta (Cyprus)	4–0	(Armenia) Banants	3–0	1–0
Olimpia Bălți (Moldova)	1–1 (a) (Note: Order of legs reversed after original draw.)	(Azerbaijan) Khazar Lankaran	0–0	1–1
Šibenik (Croatia)	3–0	(Malta) Sliema Wanderers	0–0	3–0
Tobol (Kazakhstan)	2–4	(Bosnia and Herzegovina) Zrinjski Mostar	1–2	1–2
Ulisses (Armenia)	0–1	(Israel) Bnei Yehuda	0–0	0–1
Rabotnicki (North Macedonia)	11–0	(Andorra) Lusitanos	5–0	6–0
Tirana (Albania)	1–0	(Hungary) Zalaegerszeg	0–0	1–0 (a.e.t.)
Zestaponi (Georgia (country))	5–0	(San Marino) Faetano	5–0	0–0
NSÍ (Faroe Islands)	1–4	(Sweden) Gefle IF	0–2	1–2
Torpedo Zhodino (Belarus)	6–1	(Iceland) Fylkir	3–0	3–1
Randers (Denmark)	7–3	(Luxembourg) F91 Dudelange	6–1	1–2
Portadown (Northern Ireland)	2–1	(Latvia) Skonto	1–1	1–0
TPS (Finland)	7–1	(Wales) Port Talbot Town	3–1	4–0
KR (Iceland)	5–2	(Northern Ireland) Glentoran	3–0	2–2
Grevenmacher (Luxembourg)	4–5	(Republic of Ireland) Dundalk	3–3	1–2
Kalmar FF (Sweden)	4–0	(Faroe Islands) EB/Streymur	1–0	3–0
Llanelli (Wales)	4–5	(Lithuania) Tauras Tauragė	2–2	2–3 (a.e.t.)
Narva Trans (Estonia)	0–7	(Finland) MYPA	0–2	0–5
Zeta (Montenegro)	1–1 (a)	(Moldova) Dacia Chișinău	1–1	0–0
Laçi (Albania)	2–8	(Belarus) Dnepr Mogilev	1–1	1–7
Shakhter Karagandy (Kazakhstan)	1–3	(Poland) Ruch Chorzów	1–2	0–1
Dinamo Tbilisi (Georgia (country))	2–1	(Estonia) Flora	2–1	0–0
Nitra (Slovakia)	3–5	(Hungary) Győri ETO	2–2	1–3
Qarabağ (Azerbaijan)	5–2	(North Macedonia) Metalurg Skopje	4–1	1–1

=== Second qualifying round ===
The first legs were played on 15 July, and the second legs were played on 22 and 23 July 2010.

Team 1	Agg.	Team 2	1st leg	2nd leg
Cercle Brugge (Belgium)	2–2 (a)	(Finland) TPS	0–1	2–1
Motherwell (Scotland)	2–0	(Iceland) Breiðablik	1–0	1–0
Anorthosis Famagusta (Cyprus)	3–2 (Note: Order of legs reversed after original draw.)	(Croatia) Šibenik	0–2	3–0 (a.e.t.)
Lausanne-Sport (Switzerland)	2–1	(Bosnia and Herzegovina) Borac Banja Luka	1–0	1–1
Šiauliai (Lithuania)	0–7	(Poland) Wisła Kraków	0–2	0–5
Kalmar FF (Sweden)	2–0	(Moldova) Dacia Chișinău	0–0	2–0
Utrecht (Netherlands)	5–1	(Albania) Tirana	4–0	1–1
HIT Gorica (Slovenia)	1–4	(Denmark) Randers	0–3	1–1
Marítimo (Portugal)	6–4	(Republic of Ireland) Sporting Fingal	3–2	3–2
Sūduva (Lithuania)	2–6	(Austria) Rapid Wien	0–2	2–4
Ventspils (Latvia)	1–3	(North Macedonia) Teteks	0–0	1–3
OFK Beograd (Serbia)	3–2	(Belarus) Torpedo Zhodino	2–2	1–0
Olimpia Bălți (Moldova)	1–7	(Romania) Dinamo București	0–2	1–5
MYPA (Finland)	8–0	(Andorra) Sant Julià	3–0	5–0 (Note: Original match abandoned in the 80th minute due to adverse weather conditions, with MYPA leading 1–0. The match was replayed on 23 July 2010 at 18:30 CEST from the beginning.)
Videoton (Hungary)	1–3	(Slovenia) Maribor	1–1	0–2
Brøndby (Denmark)	3–0	(Liechtenstein) Vaduz	3–0	0–0
Stabæk (Norway)	3–3 (a)	(Belarus) Dnepr Mogilev	2–2	1–1
Shamrock Rovers (Republic of Ireland)	2–1	(Israel) Bnei Yehuda	1–1	1–0
IF Elfsborg (Sweden)	3–1	(Moldova) Iskra-Stal	2–1	1–0
KR (Iceland)	2–6	(Ukraine) Karpaty Lviv	0–3	2–3
Maccabi Tel Aviv (Israel)	3–2	(Montenegro) Mogren	2–0	1–2
Austria Wien	3–2	(Bosnia and Herzegovina) Široki Brijeg	2–2	1–0
Tauras Tauragė (Lithuania)	1–6	(Cyprus) APOEL	0–3	1–3
Molde (Norway)	2–2 (a)	(Latvia) Jelgava	1–0	1–2
Zestaponi (Georgia (country))	3–1	(Slovakia) Dukla Banská Bystrica	3–0	0–1
Honka (Finland)	2–3	(Wales) Bangor City	1–1	1–2
Levski Sofia (Bulgaria)	8–0	(Republic of Ireland) Dundalk	6–0	2–0
WIT Georgia (Georgia (country))	0–6	(Czech Republic) Baník Ostrava	0–6	0–0
Rabotnicki (North Macedonia)	1–0	(Armenia) Mika	1–0	0–0
Atyrau (Kazakhstan)	0–5	(Hungary) Győri ETO	0–3 (Note: UEFA awarded Győri ETO a 3–0 win due to Atyrau fielding a suspended player in the first leg. The original match had ended in a 2–0 win for Győri ETO.)	0–2
Portadown (Northern Ireland)	2–3	(Azerbaijan) Qarabağ	1–2	1–1
Beşiktaş (Turkey)	7–0	(Faroe Islands) Víkingur Gøta	3–0	4–0
Differdange 03 (Luxembourg)	3–5	(Serbia) Spartak Zlatibor Voda	3–3	0–2
Dinamo Minsk (Belarus)	10–1	(Estonia) Sillamäe Kalev	5–1	5–0
Valletta (Malta)	1–1 (a)	(Poland) Ruch Chorzów	1–1	0–0
Baku (Azerbaijan)	2–4	(Montenegro) Budućnost Podgorica	0–3 (Note: UEFA awarded Budućnost Podgorica a 3–0 win due to Baku fielding a suspended player in the first leg. The original match had ended in a 2–1 win for Baku.)	2–1
Zrinjski Mostar (Bosnia and Herzegovina)	13–3	(San Marino) Tre Penne	4–1	9–2
Gefle IF (Sweden)	2–4	(Georgia (country)) Dinamo Tbilisi	1–2	1–2
Cliftonville (Northern Ireland)	1–0	(Croatia) Cibalia	1–0	0–0
Besa (Albania)	1–11	(Greece) Olympiacos	0–5	1–6

=== Third qualifying round ===
The first legs were played on 27 and 29 July, and the second legs were played on 3 and 5 August 2010.

Team 1	Agg.	Team 2	1st leg	2nd leg
Odense (Denmark)	5–3	(Bosnia and Herzegovina) Zrinjski Mostar	5–3	0–0
Dnepr Mogilev (Belarus)	3–1	(Czech Republic) Baník Ostrava	1–0	2–1
Rabotnicki (North Macedonia)	0–4 (Note: Order of legs reversed after original draw.)	(England) Liverpool	0–2	0–2
Marítimo (Portugal)	10–3	(Wales) Bangor City	8–2	2–1
Beroe Stara Zagora (Bulgaria)	1–4	(Austria) Rapid Wien	1–1	0–3
MYPA (Finland)	4–5	(Romania) Timișoara	1–2	3–3
CSKA Sofia (Bulgaria)	5–1	(Northern Ireland) Cliftonville	3–0	2–1
Karpaty Lviv (Ukraine)	2–0	(Georgia (country)) Zestaponi	1–0	1–0
Shamrock Rovers (Republic of Ireland)	0–3	(Italy) Juventus	0–2	0–1
IF Elfsborg (Sweden)	7–1	(North Macedonia) Teteks	5–0	2–1
Nordsjælland (Denmark)	1–3	(Portugal) Sporting CP	0–1	1–2
Maribor (Slovenia)	6–2	(Scotland) Hibernian	3–0	3–2
Red Star Belgrade (Serbia)	2–3	(Slovakia) Slovan Bratislava	1–2	1–1
Inter Turku (Finland)	3–8	(Belgium) Genk	1–5	2–3
Ruch Chorzów (Poland)	1–6	Austria Wien	1–3	0–3
Viktoria Plzeň (Czech Republic)	1–4	(Turkey) Beşiktaş	1–1	0–3
Olympiacos (Greece)	2–2 (a)	(Israel) Maccabi Tel Aviv	2–1	0–1
Wisła Kraków (Poland)	2–4	(Azerbaijan) Qarabağ	0–1	2–3
Sturm Graz (Austria)	3–1	(Georgia (country)) Dinamo Tbilisi	2–0	1–1
Cercle Brugge (Belgium)	2–3	(Cyprus) Anorthosis Famagusta	1–0	1–3
Budućnost Podgorica (Montenegro)	1–3	(Denmark) Brøndby	1–2	0–1
Molde (Norway)	4–5	(Germany) VfB Stuttgart	2–3	2–2
Maccabi Haifa (Israel)	2–3	(Belarus) Dinamo Minsk	1–0	1–3
Utrecht (Netherlands)	4–1	(Switzerland) Luzern	1–0	3–1
Sibir Novosibirsk (Russia)	2–2 (a)	(Cyprus) Apollon Limassol	1–0	1–2
Randers (Denmark)	3–4	(Switzerland) Lausanne-Sport	2–3	1–1
Dinamo București (Romania)	3–4	(Croatia) Hajduk Split	3–1	0–3
AZ (Netherlands)	2–1	(Sweden) IFK Göteborg	2–0	0–1
Spartak Zlatibor Voda (Serbia)	2–3	(Ukraine) Dnipro Dnipropetrovsk	2–1	0–2
Győri ETO (Hungary)	1–1 (4–3 p)	(France) Montpellier	0–1	1–0 (a.e.t.)
Aalesund (Norway)	1–4	(Scotland) Motherwell	1–1	0–3
Kalmar FF (Sweden)	3–6	(Bulgaria) Levski Sofia	1–1	2–5
Galatasaray (Turkey)	7–3	(Serbia) OFK Beograd	2–2	5–1
Jagiellonia Białystok (Poland)	3–4	(Greece) Aris	1–2	2–2
APOEL (Cyprus)	4–1	(Czech Republic) Jablonec	1–0	3–1

== Play-off round ==
The draw for the play-off round was held on 6 August 2010. The first legs were played on 17 and 19 August, and the second legs were played on 24 and 26 August 2010.

Team 1	Agg.	Team 2	1st leg	2nd leg
Paris Saint-Germain (France)	5–4	(Israel) Maccabi Tel Aviv	2–0	3–4
Bayer Leverkusen (Germany)	6–1	(Ukraine) Tavriya Simferopol	3–0	3–1
CSKA Moscow (Russia)	6–1	(Cyprus) Anorthosis Famagusta	4–0	2–1
Hajduk Split (Croatia)	5–2	(Romania) Unirea Urziceni	4–1	1–1
Feyenoord (Netherlands)	1–2	(Belgium) Gent	1–0	0–2
Genk (Belgium)	2–7	(Portugal) Porto	0–3	2–4
Debrecen (Hungary)	4–1	(Bulgaria) Litex Lovech	2–0	2–1
Aris (Greece)	2–1	Austria Wien	1–0	1–1
Galatasaray (Turkey)	3–3 (a)	(Ukraine) Karpaty Lviv	2–2	1–1
Palermo (Italy)	5–3	(Slovenia) Maribor	3–0	2–3
Club Brugge (Belgium)	5–3	(Belarus) Dinamo Minsk	2–1	3–2
Omonia (Cyprus)	2–3	(Ukraine) Metalist Kharkiv	0–1	2–2
Vaslui (Romania)	0–2	(France) Lille	0–0	0–2
Napoli (Italy)	3–0	(Sweden) IF Elfsborg	1–0	2–0
Sporting CP (Portugal)	3–2	(Denmark) Brøndby	0–2	3–0
Steaua București (Romania)	1–1 (4–3 p) (Note: Order of legs reversed after original draw.)	(Switzerland) Grasshopper	1–0	0–1 (a.e.t.)
Liverpool (England)	3–1	(Turkey) Trabzonspor	1–0	2–1
Celtic (Scotland)	2–4	(Netherlands) Utrecht	2–0	0–4
Borussia Dortmund (Germany)	5–0	(Azerbaijan) Qarabağ	4–0	1–0
AIK (Sweden)	1–2	(Bulgaria) Levski Sofia	0–0	1–2
Sturm Graz (Austria)	1–3	(Italy) Juventus	1–2	0–1
Getafe (Spain)	2–1	(Cyprus) APOEL	1–0	1–1 (a.e.t.)
Dundee United (Scotland)	1–2	(Greece) AEK Athens	0–1	1–1
AZ (Netherlands)	3–2	(Kazakhstan) Aktobe	2–0	1–2
Dnipro Dnipropetrovsk (Ukraine)	0–1	(Poland) Lech Poznań	0–1	0–0
Rapid Wien (Austria)	4–3	(England) Aston Villa	1–1	3–2
CSKA Sofia (Bulgaria)	5–2	(Wales) The New Saints	3–0	2–2
Beşiktaş (Turkey)	6–0	(Finland) HJK	2–0	4–0
Slovan Bratislava (Slovakia)	2–3	(Germany) VfB Stuttgart	0–1	2–2
Sibir Novosibirsk (Russia)	1–5	(Netherlands) PSV Eindhoven	1–0	0–5
BATE Borisov (Belarus)	5–1	(Portugal) Marítimo	3–0	2–1
Lausanne-Sport (Switzerland)	2–2 (4–3 p)	(Russia) Lokomotiv Moscow	1–1	1–1 (a.e.t.)
Győri ETO (Hungary)	1–4	(Croatia) Dinamo Zagreb	0–2	1–2
Odense (Denmark)	3–1	(Scotland) Motherwell	2–1	1–0
PAOK (Greece)	2–1	(Turkey) Fenerbahçe	1–0	1–1 (a.e.t.)
Villarreal (Spain)	7–1	(Belarus) Dnepr Mogilev	5–0	2–1
Timișoara (Romania)	0–3	(England) Manchester City	0–1	0–2

== Group stage ==
Location of teams of the 2010–11 UEFA Europa League group stage.
Red: Group A; Yellow: Group B; Green: Group C; Dark green: Group D;
Purple: Group E; Pink: Group F; Blue: Group G; Orange: Group H;
Brown: Group I; Deep pink: Group J; Cyan: Group K; Spring green: Group L.
Location of Benelux teams in the 2010–11 UEFA Europa League league phase.

The 48 clubs were drawn into twelve groups of four on 27 August 2010 in Monaco. In each group, teams play against each other home-and-away in a round-robin format. The matchdays are 16 September 30 September, 21 October 4 November, 1–2 December, and 15–16 December 2010. The group winners and runners-up advance to the round of 32, where they are joined by the eight third-placed teams from the group stage of the 2010–11 UEFA Champions League.

If two or more teams are equal on points on completion of the group matches, the following criteria are applied to determine the rankings (in descending order):

1. higher number of points obtained in the group matches played among the teams in question;
2. superior goal difference from the group matches played among the teams in question;
3. higher number of goals scored away from home in the group matches played among the teams in question;
4. superior goal difference from all group matches played;
5. higher number of goals scored;
6. higher number of coefficient points accumulated by the club in question, as well as its association, over the previous five seasons.

Following a trial at last year's UEFA Europa League, UEFA have announced that in both this year's and the 2011–12 competition, two extra officials would be used – with one on each goal line.

=== Group A ===
Pos	Team	Pld	W	D	L	GF	GA	GD	Pts	Qualification	MC	LEC	JUV	SAL
1	(England) Manchester City	6	3	2	1	11	6	+5	11	Advance to knockout phase	—	3–1	1–1	3–0
2	(Poland) Lech Poznań	6	3	2	1	11	8	+3	11	Advance to knockout phase	3–1	—	1–1	2–0
3	(Italy) Juventus	6	0	6	0	7	7	0	6		1–1	3–3	—	0–0
4	(Austria) Red Bull Salzburg	6	0	2	4	1	9	−8	2		0–2	0–1	1–1	—

Source: Soccerway

=== Group B ===
Pos	Team	Pld	W	D	L	GF	GA	GD	Pts	Qualification	LEV	ARI	ATL	RBK
1	(Germany) Bayer Leverkusen	6	3	3	0	8	2	+6	12	Advance to knockout phase	—	1–0	1–1	4–0
2	(Greece) Aris	6	3	1	2	7	5	+2	10	Advance to knockout phase	0–0	—	1–0	2–0
3	(Spain) Atlético Madrid	6	2	2	2	9	7	+2	8		1–1	2–3	—	3–0
4	(Norway) Rosenborg	6	1	0	5	3	13	−10	3		0–1	2–1	1–2	—

Source: Soccerway

=== Group C ===
Pos	Team	Pld	W	D	L	GF	GA	GD	Pts	Qualification	SCP	LIL	GNT	LS
1	(Portugal) Sporting CP	6	4	0	2	14	6	+8	12	Advance to knockout phase	—	1–0	5–1	5–0
2	(France) Lille	6	2	2	2	8	6	+2	8	Advance to knockout phase	1–2	—	3–0	1–0
3	(Belgium) Gent	6	2	1	3	8	13	−5	7		3–1	1–1	—	1–0
4	(Bulgaria) Levski Sofia	6	2	1	3	6	11	−5	7		1–0	2–2	3–2	—

Source: Soccerway

=== Group D ===
Pos	Team	Pld	W	D	L	GF	GA	GD	Pts	Qualification	VLR	PAOK	DZ	BRG
1	(Spain) Villarreal	6	4	0	2	8	5	+3	12	Advance to knockout phase	—	1–0	3–0	2–1
2	(Greece) PAOK	6	3	2	1	5	3	+2	11	Advance to knockout phase	1–0	—	1–0	1–1
3	(Croatia) Dinamo Zagreb	6	2	1	3	4	5	−1	7		2–0	0–1	—	0–0
4	(Belgium) Club Brugge	6	0	3	3	4	8	−4	3		1–2	1–1	0–2	—

Source: Soccerway

=== Group E ===
Pos	Team	Pld	W	D	L	GF	GA	GD	Pts	Qualification	DK	BTE	AZ	SHF
1	(Ukraine) Dynamo Kyiv	6	3	2	1	10	6	+4	11	Advance to knockout phase	—	2–2	2–0	0–0
2	(Belarus) BATE Borisov	6	3	1	2	11	11	0	10	Advance to knockout phase	1–4	—	4–1	3–1
3	(Netherlands) AZ	6	2	1	3	8	10	−2	7		1–2	3–0	—	2–1
4	(Moldova) Sheriff Tiraspol	6	1	2	3	5	7	−2	5		2–0	0–1	1–1	—

Source: Soccerway

=== Group F ===
Pos	Team	Pld	W	D	L	GF	GA	GD	Pts	Qualification	CSM	SPP	PAL	LAU
1	(Russia) CSKA Moscow	6	5	1	0	18	3	+15	16	Advance to knockout phase	—	3–0	3–1	5–1
2	(Czech Republic) Sparta Prague	6	2	3	1	12	12	0	9	Advance to knockout phase	1–1	—	3–2	3–3
3	(Italy) Palermo	6	2	1	3	7	11	−4	7		0–3	2–2	—	1–0
4	(Switzerland) Lausanne-Sport	6	0	1	5	5	16	−11	1		0–3	1–3	0–1	—

Source: Soccerway

=== Group G ===
Pos	Team	Pld	W	D	L	GF	GA	GD	Pts	Qualification	ZNT	AND	AEK	HAJ
1	(Russia) Zenit Saint Petersburg	6	6	0	0	18	6	+12	18	Advance to knockout phase	—	3–1	4–2	2–0
2	(Belgium) Anderlecht	6	2	1	3	8	8	0	7	Advance to knockout phase	1–3	—	3–0	2–0
3	(Greece) AEK Athens	6	2	1	3	9	13	−4	7		0–3	1–1	—	3–1
4	(Croatia) Hajduk Split	6	1	0	5	5	13	−8	3		2–3	1–0	1–3	—

Source: Soccerway

=== Group H ===
Pos	Team	Pld	W	D	L	GF	GA	GD	Pts	Qualification	STU	YB	GET	OB
1	(Germany) VfB Stuttgart	6	5	0	1	16	6	+10	15	Advance to knockout phase	—	3–0	1–0	5–1
2	(Switzerland) Young Boys	6	3	0	3	10	10	0	9	Advance to knockout phase	4–2	—	2–0	4–2
3	(Spain) Getafe	6	2	1	3	4	8	−4	7		0–3	1–0	—	2–1
4	(Denmark) Odense	6	1	1	4	8	14	−6	4		1–2	2–0	1–1	—

Source: Soccerway

=== Group I ===
Pos	Team	Pld	W	D	L	GF	GA	GD	Pts	Qualification	PSV	MET	SAM	DEB
1	(Netherlands) PSV Eindhoven	6	4	2	0	10	3	+7	14	Advance to knockout phase	—	0–0	1–1	3–0
2	(Ukraine) Metalist Kharkiv	6	3	2	1	9	4	+5	11	Advance to knockout phase	0–2	—	2–1	2–1
3	(Italy) Sampdoria	6	1	2	3	4	7	−3	5		1–2	0–0	—	1–0
4	(Hungary) Debrecen	6	1	0	5	4	13	−9	3		1–2	0–5	2–0	—

Source: Soccerway

=== Group J ===
Pos	Team	Pld	W	D	L	GF	GA	GD	Pts	Qualification	PSG	SEV	DOR	KAR
1	(France) Paris Saint-Germain	6	3	3	0	9	4	+5	12	Advance to knockout phase	—	4–2	0–0	2–0
2	(Spain) Sevilla	6	3	1	2	10	7	+3	10	Advance to knockout phase	0–1	—	2–2	4–0
3	(Germany) Borussia Dortmund	6	2	3	1	10	7	+3	9		1–1	0–1	—	3–0
4	(Ukraine) Karpaty Lviv	6	0	1	5	4	15	−11	1		1–1	0–1	3–4	—

Source: Soccerway

=== Group K ===
Pos	Team	Pld	W	D	L	GF	GA	GD	Pts	Qualification	LIV	NAP	STE	UTR
1	(England) Liverpool	6	2	4	0	8	3	+5	10	Advance to knockout phase	—	3–1	4–1	0–0
2	(Italy) Napoli	6	1	4	1	8	9	−1	7	Advance to knockout phase	0–0	—	1–0	0–0
3	(Romania) Steaua București	6	1	3	2	9	11	−2	6		1–1	3–3	—	3–1
4	(Netherlands) Utrecht	6	0	5	1	5	7	−2	5		0–0	3–3	1–1	—

Source: Soccerway

=== Group L ===
Pos	Team	Pld	W	D	L	GF	GA	GD	Pts	Qualification	POR	BJK	RPD	CSS
1	(Portugal) Porto	6	5	1	0	14	4	+10	16	Advance to knockout phase	—	1–1	3–0	3–1
2	(Turkey) Beşiktaş	6	4	1	1	9	6	+3	13	Advance to knockout phase	1–3	—	2–0	1–0
3	(Austria) Rapid Wien	6	1	0	5	5	12	−7	3		1–3	1–2	—	1–2
4	(Bulgaria) CSKA Sofia	6	1	0	5	4	10	−6	3		0–1	1–2	0–2	—

Source: Soccerway

== Knockout phase ==
In the knockout phase, teams play against each other over two legs on a home-and-away basis, except for the one-match final.

The draw for the round of 32 and round of 16 was held on 17 December 2010. The draws for the quarter-finals, semi-finals and final (to determine the "home" team) were held on 18 March 2011.

=== Bracket ===
Round of 32
(Greece) PAOK	0	1	1
(Russia) CSKA Moscow	1	1	2
(Spain) Sevilla	1	1	2
(Portugal) Porto (a)	2	0	2
(Belgium) Anderlecht	0	0	0
(Netherlands) Ajax	2	3	5
(Switzerland) Basel	2	1	3
(Russia) Spartak Moscow	3	1	4
(Ukraine) Metalist Kharkiv	0	0	0
(Germany) Bayer Leverkusen	2	4	6
(Italy) Napoli	0	1	1
(Spain) Villarreal	0	2	2
(Russia) Rubin Kazan	0	2	2
(Netherlands) Twente	2	2	4
(Switzerland) Young Boys	2	1	3
(Russia) Zenit Saint Petersburg	1	3	4
(Portugal) Benfica	2	2	4
(Germany) VfB Stuttgart	1	0	1
(Belarus) BATE Borisov	2	0	2
(France) Paris Saint-Germain (a)	2	0	2
(France) Lille	2	1	3
(Netherlands) PSV Eindhoven	2	3	5
(Scotland) Rangers (a)	1	2	3
(Portugal) Sporting CP	1	2	3
(Turkey) Beşiktaş	1	0	1
(Ukraine) Dynamo Kyiv	4	4	8
(Greece) Aris	0	0	0
(England) Manchester City	0	3	3
(Poland) Lech Poznań	1	0	1
(Portugal) Braga	0	2	2
(Czech Republic) Sparta Prague	0	0	0
(England) Liverpool	0	1	1

Round of 16
(Russia) CSKA Moscow	0	1	1
(Portugal) Porto	1	2	3
(Netherlands) Ajax	0	0	0
(Russia) Spartak Moscow	1	3	4
(Germany) Bayer Leverkusen	2	1	3
(Spain) Villarreal	3	2	5
(Netherlands) Twente	3	0	3
(Russia) Zenit Saint Petersburg	0	2	2
(Portugal) Benfica	2	1	3
(France) Paris Saint-Germain	1	1	2
(Netherlands) PSV Eindhoven	0	1	1
(Scotland) Rangers	0	0	0
(Ukraine) Dynamo Kyiv	2	0	2
(England) Manchester City	0	1	1
(Portugal) Braga	1	0	1
(England) Liverpool	0	0	0

Quarter-finals
(Portugal) Porto	5	5	10
(Russia) Spartak Moscow	1	2	3
(Spain) Villarreal	5	3	8
(Netherlands) Twente	1	1	2
(Portugal) Benfica	4	2	6
(Netherlands) PSV Eindhoven	1	2	3
(Ukraine) Dynamo Kyiv	1	0	1
(Portugal) Braga (a)	1	0	1

Semi-finals
(Portugal) Porto	5	2	7
(Spain) Villarreal	1	3	4
(Portugal) Benfica	2	0	2
(Portugal) Braga (a)	1	1	2

Final
18 May – Dublin
(Portugal) Porto	1
(Portugal) Braga	0

=== Round of 32 ===
The first legs were played on 15 and 17 February, and the second legs were played on 22, 23 and 24 February 2011.

Team 1	Agg.	Team 2	1st leg	2nd leg
Napoli (Italy)	1–2	(Spain) Villarreal	0–0	1–2
Rangers (Scotland)	3–3 (a)	(Portugal) Sporting CP	1–1	2–2
Sparta Prague (Czech Republic)	0–1	(England) Liverpool	0–0	0–1
Anderlecht (Belgium)	0–5	(Netherlands) Ajax	0–3	0–2
Lech Poznań (Poland)	1–2	(Portugal) Braga	1–0	0–2
Beşiktaş (Turkey)	1–8	(Ukraine) Dynamo Kyiv	1–4	0–4
Basel (Switzerland)	3–4	(Russia) Spartak Moscow	2–3	1–1
Young Boys (Switzerland)	3–4	(Russia) Zenit Saint Petersburg	2–1	1–3
Aris (Greece)	0–3	(England) Manchester City	0–0	0–3
PAOK (Greece)	1–2	(Russia) CSKA Moscow	0–1	1–1
Sevilla (Spain)	2–2 (a)	(Portugal) Porto	1–2	1–0
Rubin Kazan (Russia)	2–4	(Netherlands) Twente	0–2	2–2
Lille (France)	3–5	(Netherlands) PSV Eindhoven	2–2	1–3
Benfica (Portugal)	4–1	(Germany) VfB Stuttgart	2–1	2–0
BATE Borisov (Belarus)	2–2 (a)	(France) Paris Saint-Germain	2–2	0–0
Metalist Kharkiv (Ukraine)	0–6	(Germany) Bayer Leverkusen	0–4	0–2

=== Round of 16 ===
The first legs were played on 10 March, and the second legs were played on 17 March 2011.

Team 1	Agg.	Team 2	1st leg	2nd leg
Benfica (Portugal)	3–2	(France) Paris Saint-Germain	2–1	1–1
Dynamo Kyiv (Ukraine)	2–1	(England) Manchester City	2–0	0–1
Twente (Netherlands)	3–2	(Russia) Zenit Saint Petersburg	3–0	0–2
CSKA Moscow (Russia)	1–3	(Portugal) Porto	0–1	1–2
PSV Eindhoven (Netherlands)	1–0	(Scotland) Rangers	0–0	1–0
Bayer Leverkusen (Germany)	3–5	(Spain) Villarreal	2–3	1–2
Ajax (Netherlands)	0–4	(Russia) Spartak Moscow	0–1	0–3
Braga (Portugal)	1–0 (Note: Order of legs reversed after original draw due to proximity between the cities of Porto and Braga.)	(England) Liverpool	1–0	0–0

=== Quarter-finals ===
The first legs were played on 7 April, and the second legs were played on 14 April 2011.

Team 1	Agg.	Team 2	1st leg	2nd leg
Porto (Portugal)	10–3	(Russia) Spartak Moscow	5–1	5–2
Benfica (Portugal)	6–3	(Netherlands) PSV Eindhoven	4–1	2–2
Villarreal (Spain)	8–2	(Netherlands) Twente	5–1	3–1
Dynamo Kyiv (Ukraine)	1–1 (a) (Note: Order of legs reversed after original draw due to proximity between the cities of Porto and Braga.)	(Portugal) Braga	1–1	0–0

=== Semi-finals ===
The first legs were played on 28 April, and the second legs were played on 5 May 2011.

Team 1	Agg.	Team 2	1st leg	2nd leg
Benfica (Portugal)	2–2 (a) (Note: Order of legs reversed after original draw due to proximity between the cities of Porto and Braga.)	(Portugal) Braga	2–1	0–1
Porto (Portugal)	7–4	(Spain) Villarreal	5–1	2–3

=== Final ===
The 2011 UEFA Europa League final was played on 18 May 2011 at Aviva Stadium in Dublin, Ireland. Due to UEFA rules against corporate sponsorship outside the federation, for the final the stadium was referred to as the "Dublin Arena".

18 May 2011
19:45 UTC+1

Porto (Portugal)	1–0	(Portugal) Braga
Falcao 44'	Report

Aviva Stadium, Dublin
Attendance: 45,391
Referee: Carlos Velasco Carballo (Spain)

== Top goalscorers ==
The top scorers from the 2010–11 UEFA Europa League (excluding qualifying rounds and play-off round) are as follows:

Rank	Name	Team	Goals	Minutes played
1	(Colombia) Radamel Falcao	(Portugal) Porto	17	1098
2	(Italy) Giuseppe Rossi	(Spain) Villarreal	11	1037
3	(Czech Republic) Tomáš Necid	(Russia) CSKA Moscow	6	526
4	(Mali) Frédéric Kanouté	(Spain) Sevilla	5	461
4	(Ivory Coast) Wilfried Bony	(Czech Republic) Sparta Prague	5	526
4	(Brazil) Nilmar	(Spain) Villarreal	5	572
4	(Latvia) Artjoms Rudņevs	(Poland) Lech Poznań	5	621
4	(Uruguay) Edinson Cavani	(Italy) Napoli	5	667
4	(Colombia) Fredy Guarín	(Portugal) Porto	5	808
4	(Ukraine) Artem Milevskyi	(Ukraine) Dynamo Kyiv	5	967
4	(Hungary) Balázs Dzsudzsák	(Netherlands) PSV Eindhoven	5	973

== See also ==
- 2010–11 UEFA Champions League
- 2011 UEFA Super Cup
