= 2010–11 UEFA Champions League qualifying =

European football tournament

2010–11 UEFA Champions League qualifying was the preliminary phase of the 2010–11 UEFA Champions League, prior to the competition proper. Qualification consisted of the qualifying phase (first to third rounds) and the play-off round.

There were two paths:

- Champions Path, which included all domestic champions which did not automatically qualified for the group stage.
- Non-Champions Path (also called the Best-placed Path), which included all non-domestic champions which did not automatically qualified for the group stage.

Each tie was played over two legs, with each team playing one leg at home. The team that had the higher aggregate score over the two legs progressed to the next round. In the event that aggregate scores finished level, the away goals rule was applied, i.e., the team that scored more goals away from home over the two legs progressed. If away goals were also equal, then 30 minutes of extra time were played, divided into two 15-minute halves. The away goals rule is again applied after extra time, i.e., if there were goals scored during extra time and the aggregate score was still level, the visiting team qualified by virtue of more away goals scored. If no goals were scored during extra time, the tie was decided via a penalty shoot-out.

All times are CEST (UTC+2), as listed by UEFA.

== Round and draw dates ==
All draws held at UEFA headquarters in Nyon, Switzerland.

Phase	Round	Draw date	First leg	Second leg
Qualifying	First qualifying round	21 June 2010	29–30 June 2010	6–7 July 2010
Qualifying	Second qualifying round	21 June 2010	13–14 July 2010	20–21 July 2010
Qualifying	Third qualifying round	16 July 2010	27–28 July 2010	3–4 August 2010
Play-off	Play-off round	6 August 2010	17–18 August 2010	24–25 August 2010

== Teams ==
Below are the 54 teams (39 in Champions Path, 15 in Non-Champions Path) that were involved in the qualifying phase and play-off round, grouped by their starting rounds. The ten winners of the play-off round (five in Champions Path, five in Non-Champions Path) qualified for the group stage to join the 22 automatic qualifiers. The losing teams from the third qualifying round and the play-off round entered the Europa League play-off round and the group stage, respectively.

In each round, teams were seeded based on their 2010 UEFA club coefficients. Prior to the draw, UEFA could form "groups" in accordance with the principles set by the Club Competitions Committee, but they were purely for convenience of the draw and did not resemble any real groupings in the sense of the competition, while ensuring that teams from the same association were not drawn against each other.

Key to colours
Qualified for the group stage
Eliminated in the play-off round; Advanced to the Europa League group stage
Eliminated in the third qualifying round; Advanced to the Europa League play-off round

=== Champions Path ===
Third qualifying round
Team	Coeff.
(Switzerland) Basel	48.675
(Belgium) Anderlecht	42.580
(Denmark) Copenhagen	34.470

Second qualifying round
Team	Coeff.
(Israel) Hapoel Tel Aviv	27.775
(Czech Republic) Sparta Prague	27.395
(Norway) Rosenborg	23.980
(Austria) Red Bull Salzburg	19.915
(Bulgaria) Litex Lovech	15.900
(Croatia) Dinamo Zagreb	14.466
(Serbia) Partizan	13.800
(Belarus) BATE Borisov	13.308
(Poland) Lech Poznań	11.008
(Slovakia) Žilina	10.666
(Moldova) Sheriff Tiraspol	5.458
(Hungary) Debrecen	5.350
(Cyprus) Omonia	4.599
(Sweden) AIK	3.838
(Republic of Ireland) Bohemians	2.908
(Lithuania) Ekranas	2.683
(Kazakhstan) Aktobe	2.399
(Finland) HJK	2.399
(Estonia) Levadia Tallinn	2.374
(Latvia) Liepājas Metalurgs	2.149
(Iceland) FH	2.083
(Bosnia and Herzegovina) Željezničar	1.749
(Georgia (country)) Olimpi Rustavi	1.649
(Armenia) Pyunik	1.599
(Slovenia) Koper	1.391
(Azerbaijan) Inter Baku	1.349
(North Macedonia) Renova	1.316
(Albania) Dinamo Tirana	1.049
(Faroe Islands) HB	0.866
(Wales) The New Saints	0.766
(Northern Ireland) Linfield	0.574
(Luxembourg) Jeunesse Esch	0.249

First qualifying round
Team	Coeff.
(Andorra) FC Santa Coloma	0.700
(San Marino) Tre Fiori	0.650
(Malta) Birkirkara	0.433
(Montenegro) Rudar Pljevlja	0.425

=== Non-Champions Path ===
Play-off round
Team	Coeff.
(Spain) Sevilla	108.951
(Germany) Werder Bremen	94.841
(England) Tottenham Hotspur	56.371
(Italy) Sampdoria	30.857
(France) Auxerre	19.748

Third qualifying round
Team	Coeff.
(Russia) Zenit Saint Petersburg	61.258
(Netherlands) Ajax	55.309
(Turkey) Fenerbahçe	54.890
(Ukraine) Dynamo Kyiv	42.910
(Portugal) Braga	39.659
(Scotland) Celtic	38.158
(Romania) Unirea Urziceni	18.898
(Greece) PAOK	11.479
(Switzerland) Young Boys	7.675
(Belgium) Gent	6.580

== First qualifying round ==
=== Seeding ===
Seeded	Unseeded
(Andorra) FC Santa Coloma (San Marino) Tre Fiori	(Malta) Birkirkara (Montenegro) Rudar Pljevlja

=== Summary ===
Team 1	Agg.	Team 2	1st leg	2nd leg
Tre Fiori (San Marino)	1–7	(Montenegro) Rudar Pljevlja	0–3	1–4
FC Santa Coloma (Andorra)	3–7	(Malta) Birkirkara	0–3 (Note: Match originally postponed due to bad pitch conditions caused by heavy rain. FC Santa Coloma suggested an alternative on 30 June, but UEFA awarded Birkirkara a 3–0 away win on 1 July.)	3–4

=== Matches ===
30 June 2010
20:30

Tre Fiori (San Marino)	0–3	(Montenegro) Rudar Pljevlja
	Report	Useni 31'; Vlahović 40'; I. Jovanović 90+5'

Stadio Olimpico, Serravalle
Attendance: 681
Referee: Alan Mario Sant (Malta)
7 July 2010
18:00

Rudar Pljevlja (Montenegro)	4–1	(San Marino) Tre Fiori
Ranđelović 7', 67'; Vlahović 83'; M. Jovanović 85'	Report	Vannoni 29'

Stadion Pod Goricom, Podgorica (Note: Rudar Pljevlja played their home games in Podgorica at Stadion Pod Goricom as their own Stadion Gradski did not meet UEFA criteria.)
Attendance: 400
Referee: Ghennadi Sidenco (Moldova)

Rudar Pljevlja won 7–1 on aggregate.

29 June 2010
19:00

FC Santa Coloma (Andorra)	0–3 Awarded (Note: The FC Santa Coloma v Birkirkara match originally postponed due to bad pitch conditions caused by heavy rain. FC Santa Coloma suggested an alternative on 30 June, but UEFA awarded Birkirkara a 3–0 away win on 1 July.)	(Malta) Birkirkara
	Report

Estadi Comunal d'Andorra la Vella, Andorra la Vella
Referee: Anthony Buttimer (Republic of Ireland)
6 July 2010
18:00

Birkirkara (Malta)	4–3	(Andorra) FC Santa Coloma
Galea 10', 31'; Cilia 35', 45+2'	Report	N. Urbani 21'; Jiménez 45'; M. Urbani 85'

Centenary Stadium, Ta' Qali
Attendance: 878
Referee: Bobby Madden (Scotland)

Birkirkara won 7–3 on aggregate.

== Second qualifying round ==
=== Seeding ===
Group 1		Group 2		Group 3	
Seeded	Unseeded	Seeded	Unseeded	Seeded	Unseeded
(Czech Republic) Sparta Prague (Serbia) Partizan (Poland) Lech Poznań (Hungary) Debrecen (Kazakhstan) Aktobe	(Estonia) Levadia Tallinn (Latvia) Liepājas Metalurgs (Georgia (country)) Olimpi Rustavi (Armenia) Pyunik (Azerbaijan) Inter Baku	(Israel) Hapoel Tel Aviv (Bulgaria) Litex Lovech (Croatia) Dinamo Zagreb (Slovakia) Žilina (Moldova) Sheriff Tiraspol (Cyprus) Omonia	(Bosnia and Herzegovina) Željezničar (Slovenia) Koper (North Macedonia) Renova (Albania) Dinamo Tirana (Malta) Birkirkara (Montenegro) Rudar Pljevlja	(Norway) Rosenborg (Austria) Red Bull Salzburg (Belarus) BATE Borisov (Sweden) AIK (Republic of Ireland) Bohemians (Lithuania) Ekranas	(Finland) HJK (Iceland) FH (Faroe Islands) HB (Wales) The New Saints (Northern Ireland) Linfield (Luxembourg) Jeunesse Esch

Notes

1. ^{†} Winners of the previous qualifying round whose identity was not known at the time of the draw. Teams in italics defeated a team with a higher coefficient in the previous qualifying round, thus effectively taking the coefficient of their defeated opponent in the draw for this round.

=== Summary ===
Team 1	Agg.	Team 2	1st leg	2nd leg
Liepājas Metalurgs (Latvia)	0–5	(Czech Republic) Sparta Prague	0–3	0–2
Aktobe (Kazakhstan)	3–1	(Georgia (country)) Olimpi Rustavi	2–0	1–1
Levadia Tallinn (Estonia)	3–4	(Hungary) Debrecen	1–1	2–3
Partizan (Serbia)	4–1	(Armenia) Pyunik	3–1	1–0
Inter Baku (Azerbaijan)	1–1 (8–9 p)	(Poland) Lech Poznań	0–1	1–0 (a.e.t.)
Dinamo Zagreb (Croatia)	5–4	(Slovenia) Koper	5–1	0–3
Litex Lovech (Bulgaria)	5–0	(Montenegro) Rudar Pljevlja	1–0	4–0
Birkirkara (Malta)	1–3	(Slovakia) Žilina	1–0	0–3
Sheriff Tiraspol (Moldova)	3–2	(Albania) Dinamo Tirana	3–1	0–1
Hapoel Tel Aviv (Israel)	6–0	(Bosnia and Herzegovina) Željezničar	5–0	1–0
Omonia (Cyprus)	5–0	(North Macedonia) Renova	3–0	2–0
Red Bull Salzburg (Austria)	5–1	(Faroe Islands) HB	5–0	0–1
Bohemians (Republic of Ireland)	1–4	(Wales) The New Saints	1–0	0–4
BATE Borisov (Belarus)	6–1	(Iceland) FH	5–1	1–0
AIK (Sweden)	1–0	(Luxembourg) Jeunesse Esch	1–0	0–0
Linfield (Northern Ireland)	0–2	(Norway) Rosenborg	0–0	0–2
Ekranas (Lithuania)	1–2	(Finland) HJK	1–0	0–2 (a.e.t.)

=== Matches ===
13 July 2010
18:00

Liepājas Metalurgs (Latvia)	0–3	(Czech Republic) Sparta Prague
	Report	Kadlec 37'; Bony 51', 58'

Daugava Stadium, Liepāja
Attendance: 3,300
Referee: René Eisner (Austria)
21 July 2010
20:00

Sparta Prague (Czech Republic)	2–0	(Latvia) Liepājas Metalurgs
Matějovský 12'; Zeman 43'	Report

Generali Arena, Prague
Attendance: 8,025
Referee: Marijo Strahonja (Croatia)

Sparta Prague won 5–0 on aggregate.

14 July 2010
18:00

Aktobe (Kazakhstan)	2–0	(Georgia (country)) Olimpi Rustavi
Smakov 40' (pen.), 53'	Report

Aktobe Central Stadium, Aktobe
Attendance: 11,500
Referee: Bülent Yıldırım (Turkey)
21 July 2010
16:00

Olimpi Rustavi (Georgia (country))	1–1	(Kazakhstan) Aktobe
Rekhviashvili 30'	Report	Tleshev 90'

Poladi Stadium, Rustavi
Attendance: 4,200
Referee: Alexandru Deaconu (Romania)

Aktobe won 3–1 on aggregate.

13 July 2010
18:00

Levadia Tallinn (Estonia)	1–1	(Hungary) Debrecen
Neemelo 59'	Report	Rezes 90'

Kadriorg Stadium, Tallinn
Attendance: 1,800
Referee: Aleksei Kulbakov (Belarus)
21 July 2010
20:00

Debrecen (Hungary)	3–2	(Estonia) Levadia Tallinn
Coulibaly 24'; Mbengono 32'; Szakály 55'	Report	Nahk 3'; Leitan 53'

Stadion Oláh Gábor Út, Debrecen
Attendance: 7,500
Referee: Tom Harald Hagen (Norway)

Debrecen won 4–3 on aggregate.

14 July 2010
20:45

Partizan (Serbia)	3–1	(Armenia) Pyunik
Tomić 29'; Moreira 45+1'; Cléo 59'	Report	Yedigaryan 30'

Stadion FK Partizan, Belgrade
Attendance: 11,134
Referee: Tommy Skjerven (Norway)
21 July 2010
17:00

Pyunik (Armenia)	0–1	(Serbia) Partizan
	Report	Cléo 45+4'

Vazgen Sargsyan Republican Stadium, Yerevan
Attendance: 4,500
Referee: Marcin Borski (Poland)

Partizan won 4–1 on aggregate.

13 July 2010
17:00

Inter Baku (Azerbaijan)	0–1	(Poland) Lech Poznań
	Report	Wichniarek 47'

Tofik Bakhramov Stadium, Baku (Note: Played in Baku at Tofik Bakhramov Stadium as Inter Baku's Shafa Stadium did not meet UEFA criteria.)
Attendance: 7,000
Referee: Sascha Kever (Switzerland)
21 July 2010
20:00

Lech Poznań (Poland)	0–1 (a.e.t.)	(Azerbaijan) Inter Baku
	Report	Karlsons 84'
Penalties
Bosacki (penalty scored); Krivets (penalty missed); Peszko (penalty missed); Kiełb (penalty scored); Gancarczyk (penalty scored); Wilk (penalty scored); Injac (penalty scored); Wojtkowiak (penalty scored); Arboleda (penalty scored); Štilić (penalty scored); Kotorowski (penalty scored)	9–8	(penalty missed) Zlatinov; (penalty scored) Karlsons; (penalty scored) Odikadze; (penalty missed) Kruglov; (penalty scored) Accioly; (penalty scored) Levin; (penalty scored) Dashdemirov; (penalty scored) Chertoganov; (penalty scored) Kandelaki; (penalty scored) Červenka; (penalty missed) Lomaia

Stadion Miejski, Poznań
Attendance: 13,700
Referee: Milorad Mažić (Serbia)

1–1 on aggregate; Lech Poznań won 9–8 on penalties.

13 July 2010
20:15

Dinamo Zagreb (Croatia)	5–1	(Slovenia) Koper
Mandžukić 30', 63'; Slepička 38'; Sammir 77'; Etto 80'	Report	Bubanja 11'

Stadion Maksimir, Zagreb
Attendance: 10,000
Referee: Thorsten Kinhöfer (Germany)
20 July 2010
20:15

Koper (Slovenia)	3–0	(Croatia) Dinamo Zagreb
Handanagić 11'; Guberac 54'; Brulc 78' (pen.)	Report

Stadion Športni Park, Nova Gorica (Note: Played in Nova Gorica at Stadion Športni Park as Koper's Bonifika Stadium did not meet UEFA criteria.)
Attendance: 720
Referee: Luca Banti (Italy)

Dinamo Zagreb won 5–4 on aggregate.

13 July 2010
19:00

Litex Lovech (Bulgaria)	1–0	(Montenegro) Rudar Pljevlja
I. Popov 8'	Report

Lovech Stadium, Lovech
Attendance: 6,970
Referee: Pavel Olšiak (Slovakia)
20 July 2010
20:30

Rudar Pljevlja (Montenegro)	0–4	(Bulgaria) Litex Lovech
	Report	Niflore 28'; Jelenković 39'; Bratu 74', 90'

Stadion Pod Goricom, Podgorica
Attendance: 2,137
Referee: Stanislav Sukhina (Russia)

Litex Lovech won 5–0 on aggregate.

13 July 2010
18:00

Birkirkara (Malta)	1–0	(Slovakia) Žilina
Vukanac 1'	Report

Centenary Stadium, Ta' Qali
Attendance: 600
Referee: Simon Lee Evans (Wales)
21 July 2010
19:30

Žilina (Slovakia)	3–0	(Malta) Birkirkara
Piaček 21'; Lietava 77'; Oravec 90+2'	Report

Štadión pod Dubňom, Žilina
Attendance: 5,511
Referee: Zsolt Szabó (Hungary)

Žilina won 3–1 on aggregate.

14 July 2010
19:00

Sheriff Tiraspol (Moldova)	3–1	(Albania) Dinamo Tirana
Volkov 9'; Nikolić 62'; Nadson 70'	Report	Malacarne 12'

Sheriff Stadium, Tiraspol
Attendance: 6,951
Referee: Daniel Stålhammar (Sweden)
20 July 2010
18:00

Dinamo Tirana (Albania)	1–0	(Moldova) Sheriff Tiraspol
Vila 18'	Report

Qemal Stafa Stadium, Tirana (Note: Played in Tirana at Qemal Stafa Stadium as Dinamo Tirana's Selman Stërmasi Stadium did not meet UEFA criteria.)
Attendance: 3,000
Referee: Leontios Trattou (Cyprus)

Sheriff Tiraspol won 3–2 on aggregate.

13 July 2010
20:00

Hapoel Tel Aviv (Israel)	5–0	(Bosnia and Herzegovina) Željezničar
Lala 10', 31', 38'; Shivhon 12'; M. Bešlija 28' (o.g.)	Report

Bloomfield Stadium, Tel Aviv
Attendance: 12,000
Referee: Mark Clattenburg (England)
21 July 2010
20:15

Željezničar (Bosnia and Herzegovina)	0–1	(Israel) Hapoel Tel Aviv
	Report	Douglas da Silva 76'

Asim Ferhatović Hase Stadium, Sarajevo (Note: Played in Sarajevo at Asim Ferhatović Hase Stadium as Željezničar's Stadion Grbavica did not meet UEFA criteria.)
Attendance: 4,500
Referee: Carlos Clos Gómez (Spain)

Hapoel Tel Aviv won 6–0 on aggregate.

13 July 2010
19:00

Omonia (Cyprus)	3–0	(North Macedonia) Renova
Konstantinou 7' (pen.), 62'; Davidson Morais 28'	Report

GSP Stadium, Nicosia
Attendance: 13,400
Referee: Libor Kovařík (Czech Republic)
20 July 2010
16:30

Renova (North Macedonia)	0–2	(Cyprus) Omonia
	Report	Aloneftis 15'; Leandro 24'

Philip II Arena, Skopje (Note: Played in Skopje at Philip II Arena as Renova's City Stadium Tetovo did not meet UEFA criteria.)
Attendance: 600
Referee: Duarte Gomes (Portugal)

Omonia won 5–0 on aggregate.

13 July 2010
18:00

Red Bull Salzburg (Austria)	5–0	(Faroe Islands) HB
Zárate 21'; Jantscher 43'; Ulmer 46'; Wallner 63'; Hierländer 82'	Report

Red Bull Arena, Wals-Siezenheim
Attendance: 9,100
Referee: Igor Satchi (Moldova)
20 July 2010
18:00

HB (Faroe Islands)	1–0	(Austria) Red Bull Salzburg
Samuelsen 73'	Report

Gundadalur, Tórshavn
Attendance: 250
Referee: Tony Asumaa (Finland)

Red Bull Salzburg won 5–1 on aggregate.

13 July 2010
20:45

Bohemians (Republic of Ireland)	1–0	(Wales) The New Saints
Brennan 66'	Report

Dalymount Park, Dublin
Attendance: 2,500
Referee: Bas Nijhuis (Netherlands)
20 July 2010
20:00

The New Saints (Wales)	4–0	(Republic of Ireland) Bohemians
C. Jones 6'; Williams 14', 73'; Sharp 20'	Report

Park Hall, Oswestry
Attendance: 1,056
Referee: István Vad (Hungary)

The New Saints won 4–1 on aggregate.

14 July 2010
18:00

BATE Borisov (Belarus)	5–1	(Iceland) FH
Nyakhaichyk 48', 85', 88'; Bressan 58'; Rodionov 90'	Report	Björnsson 89'

City Stadium, Borisov
Attendance: 5,200
Referee: Anastassios Kakos (Greece)
21 July 2010
21:15

FH (Iceland)	0–1	(Belarus) BATE Borisov
	Report	Rodionov 15'

Kaplakriki, Hafnarfjörður
Attendance: 522
Referee: Hannes Kaasik (Estonia)

BATE Borisov won 6–1 on aggregate.

13 July 2010
19:00

AIK (Sweden)	1–0	(Luxembourg) Jeunesse Esch
Engblom 57'	Report

Råsunda Stadium, Solna
Attendance: 11,515
Referee: Hubert Siejewicz (Poland)
21 July 2010
17:00

Jeunesse Esch (Luxembourg)	0–0	(Sweden) AIK
	Report

Stade de la Frontière, Esch-sur-Alzette
Attendance: 1,568
Referee: Huw Jones (Wales)

AIK won 1–0 on aggregate.

14 July 2010
20:45

Linfield (Northern Ireland)	0–0	(Norway) Rosenborg
	Report

Windsor Park, Belfast
Attendance: 1,800
Referee: Saïd Ennjimi (France)
21 July 2010
20:45

Rosenborg (Norway)	2–0	(Northern Ireland) Linfield
Prica 32'; Henriksen 87'	Report

Lerkendal Stadion, Trondheim
Attendance: 6,645
Referee: Robert Schörgenhofer (Austria)

Rosenborg won 2–0 on aggregate.

14 July 2010
18:00

Ekranas (Lithuania)	1–0	(Finland) HJK
Radavičius 3'	Report

Aukštaitija Stadium, Panevėžys
Attendance: 2,500
Referee: Nicolai Vollquartz (Denmark)
21 July 2010
18:00

HJK (Finland)	2–0 (a.e.t.)	(Lithuania) Ekranas
Ojala 77'; Šidlauskas 119' (o.g.)	Report

Finnair Stadium, Helsinki
Attendance: 6,030
Referee: Dougie McDonald (Scotland)

HJK won 2–1 on aggregate.

== Third qualifying round ==
=== Seeding ===
Champions Path				Non-Champions Path	
Group 1		Group 2		Non-Champions Path	
Seeded	Unseeded	Seeded	Unseeded	Seeded	Unseeded
(Switzerland) Basel (Israel) Hapoel Tel Aviv (Czech Republic) Sparta Prague (Bulgaria) Litex Lovech (Croatia) Dinamo Zagreb	(Poland) Lech Poznań (Slovakia) Žilina (Moldova) Sheriff Tiraspol (Hungary) Debrecen (Kazakhstan) Aktobe	(Belgium) Anderlecht (Denmark) Copenhagen (Norway) Rosenborg (Austria) Red Bull Salzburg (Serbia) Partizan	(Belarus) BATE Borisov (Cyprus) Omonia (Sweden) AIK (Wales) The New Saints (Finland) HJK	(Russia) Zenit Saint Petersburg (Netherlands) Ajax (Turkey) Fenerbahçe (Ukraine) Dynamo Kyiv (Portugal) Braga	(Scotland) Celtic (Romania) Unirea Urziceni (Greece) PAOK (Switzerland) Young Boys (Belgium) Gent

Notes

1. ^{†} Winners of the previous qualifying round whose identity was not known at the time of the draw. Teams in italics defeated a team with a higher coefficient in the previous qualifying round, thus effectively taking the coefficient of their defeated opponent in the draw for this round.

=== Summary ===
Team 1	Agg.	Team 2	1st leg	2nd leg
Champions Path
Sparta Prague (Czech Republic)	2–0	(Poland) Lech Poznań	1–0	1–0
Aktobe (Kazakhstan)	2–3	(Israel) Hapoel Tel Aviv	1–0	1–3
Sheriff Tiraspol (Moldova)	2–2 (6–5 p)	(Croatia) Dinamo Zagreb	1–1	1–1 (a.e.t.)
Litex Lovech (Bulgaria)	2–4	(Slovakia) Žilina	1–1	1–3
Debrecen (Hungary)	1–5	(Switzerland) Basel	0–2	1–3
AIK (Sweden)	0–4	(Norway) Rosenborg	0–1	0–3
Partizan (Serbia)	5–1	(Finland) HJK	3–0	2–1
BATE Borisov (Belarus)	2–3	(Denmark) Copenhagen	0–0	2–3
The New Saints (Wales)	1–6	(Belgium) Anderlecht	1–3	0–3
Omonia (Cyprus)	2–5	(Austria) Red Bull Salzburg	1–1	1–4
Non-Champions Path
Ajax (Netherlands)	4–4 (a)	(Greece) PAOK	1–1	3–3
Dynamo Kyiv (Ukraine)	6–1	(Belgium) Gent	3–0	3–1
Young Boys (Switzerland)	3–2	(Turkey) Fenerbahçe	2–2	1–0
Braga (Portugal)	4–2	(Scotland) Celtic	3–0	1–2
Unirea Urziceni (Romania)	0–1	(Russia) Zenit Saint Petersburg	0–0	0–1

=== Champions Path matches ===
27 July 2010
20:30

Sparta Prague (Czech Republic)	1–0	(Poland) Lech Poznań
Brabec 75'	Report

Generali Arena, Prague
Attendance: 14,588
Referee: Paolo Tagliavento (Italy)
4 August 2010
20:00

Lech Poznań (Poland)	0–1	(Czech Republic) Sparta Prague
	Report	Kladrubský 50' (pen.)

Stadion Miejski, Poznań
Attendance: 13,200
Referee: Fredy Fautrel (France)

Sparta Prague won 2–0 on aggregate.

28 July 2010
18:00

Aktobe (Kazakhstan)	1–0	(Israel) Hapoel Tel Aviv
Smakov 67' (pen.)	Report

Aktobe Central Stadium, Aktobe
Attendance: 12,100
Referee: Sascha Kever (Switzerland)
3 August 2010
20:00

Hapoel Tel Aviv (Israel)	3–1	(Kazakhstan) Aktobe
Zahavi 16'; Sahar 31'; Ba 35' (o.g.)	Report	Tleshev 90'

Bloomfield Stadium, Tel Aviv
Attendance: 12,000
Referee: Robert Schörgenhofer (Austria)

Hapoel Tel Aviv won 3–2 on aggregate.

28 July 2010
19:00

Sheriff Tiraspol (Moldova)	1–1	(Croatia) Dinamo Zagreb
Yerokhin 35'	Report	Sammir 3'

Sheriff Stadium, Tiraspol
Attendance: 9,150
Referee: Anastassios Kakos (Greece)
4 August 2010
20:00

Dinamo Zagreb (Croatia)	1–1 (a.e.t.)	(Moldova) Sheriff Tiraspol
Sammir 55' (pen.)	Report	Volkov 16'
Penalties
Bišćan (penalty scored); Sammir (penalty missed); Badelj (penalty missed); Cufré (penalty scored); Ibáñez (penalty scored); Etto (penalty scored); Calello (penalty scored); Vrsaljko (penalty missed); Dodô (penalty missed)	5–6	(penalty scored) Samardžić; (penalty missed) Stoyanov; (penalty missed) Volkov; (penalty scored) França; (penalty scored) Adamović; (penalty scored) Vranješ; (penalty scored) Nikolić; (penalty missed) Branković; (penalty scored) Khachaturov

Stadion Maksimir, Zagreb
Attendance: 7,811
Referee: Eric Braamhaar (Netherlands)

2–2 on aggregate; Sheriff Tiraspol won 6–5 on penalties.

27 July 2010
19:00

Litex Lovech (Bulgaria)	1–1	(Slovakia) Žilina
Tom 78'	Report	Majtán 65'

Lovech Stadium, Lovech
Attendance: 5,920
Referee: Kristinn Jakobsson (Iceland)
4 August 2010
19:30

Žilina (Slovakia)	3–1	(Bulgaria) Litex Lovech
Rilke 52'; Oravec 70'; Ceesay 84'	Report	Sandrinho 50'

Štadión pod Dubňom, Žilina
Attendance: 8,123
Referee: Thomas Einwaller (Austria)

Žilina won 4–2 on aggregate.

28 July 2010
20:00

Debrecen (Hungary)	0–2	(Switzerland) Basel
	Report	Stocker 34'; Xhaka 90+2'

Szusza Ferenc Stadion, Budapest (Note: Played in Budapest at Szusza Ferenc Stadion as Debrecen's Stadion Oláh Gábor Út did not meet UEFA criteria.)
Attendance: 6,500
Referee: César Muñiz Fernández (Spain)
4 August 2010
19:45

Basel (Switzerland)	3–1	(Hungary) Debrecen
Atan 26'; Chipperfield 59'; Shaqiri 64'	Report	Coulibaly 74'

St. Jakob-Park, Basel
Attendance: 17,376
Referee: Vladislav Bezborodov (Russia)

Basel won 5–1 on aggregate.

28 July 2010
20:45

AIK (Sweden)	0–1	(Norway) Rosenborg
	Report	Henriksen 33'

Råsunda Stadium, Solna
Attendance: 16,768
Referee: Thorsten Kinhöfer (Germany)
4 August 2010
20:45

Rosenborg (Norway)	3–0	(Sweden) AIK
Prica 55'; Demidov 64'; Lustig 76'	Report

Lerkendal Stadion, Trondheim
Attendance: 14,709
Referee: Eduardo Iturralde González (Spain)

Rosenborg won 4–0 on aggregate.

28 July 2010
20:45

Partizan (Serbia)	3–0	(Finland) HJK
Iliev 8'; S. Ilić 42'; Cléo 90+2'	Report

Stadion FK Partizan, Belgrade
Attendance: 14,300
Referee: Alon Yefet (Israel)
4 August 2010
18:00

HJK (Finland)	1–2	(Serbia) Partizan
Kamara 39'	Report	Cléo 9', 90+2'

Finnair Stadium, Helsinki
Attendance: 4,230
Referee: Pavel Královec (Czech Republic)

Partizan won 5–1 on aggregate.

28 July 2010
18:00

BATE Borisov (Belarus)	0–0	(Denmark) Copenhagen
	Report

City Stadium, Borisov
Attendance: 5,300
Referee: Alexandru Tudor (Romania)
4 August 2010
19:10

Copenhagen (Denmark)	3–2	(Belarus) BATE Borisov
Santin 2'; Kvist 27'; N'Doye 59'	Report	Kontsevoy 40'; Nyakhaychyk 44'

Parken Stadium, Copenhagen
Attendance: 15,533
Referee: Mark Clattenburg (England)

Copenhagen won 3–2 on aggregate.

27 July 2010
20:45

The New Saints (Wales)	1–3	(Belgium) Anderlecht
C. Jones 52'	Report	Kljestan 7'; Legear 18'; Suárez 73'

Racecourse Ground, Wrexham (Note: Played in Wrexham at Racecourse Ground as The New Saints chose to move the match from their Park Hall ground to increase revenue.)
Attendance: 2,486
Referee: Darko Čeferin (Slovenia)
3 August 2010
20:30

Anderlecht (Belgium)	3–0	(Wales) The New Saints
De Sutter 17'; Lukaku 69', 74'	Report

Constant Vanden Stock Stadium, Brussels
Attendance: 19,338
Referee: Cristian Balaj (Romania)

Anderlecht won 6–1 on aggregate.

27 July 2010
18:00

Omonia (Cyprus)	1–1	(Austria) Red Bull Salzburg
LuaLua 90+1' (pen.)	Report	Zárate 8'

GSP Stadium, Nicosia
Attendance: 16,777
Referee: István Vad (Hungary)
4 August 2010
20:30

Red Bull Salzburg (Austria)	4–1	(Cyprus) Omonia
Švento 21'; Schiemer 37', 40'; Boghossian 58'	Report	Rengifo 90+1'

Bullen Arena, Wals-Siezenheim
Attendance: 14,400
Referee: Stefan Johannesson (Sweden)

Red Bull Salzburg won 5–2 on aggregate.

=== Non-Champions Path matches ===
28 July 2010
20:45

Ajax (Netherlands)	1–1	(Greece) PAOK
Suárez 13'	Report	Ivić 72'

Amsterdam Arena, Amsterdam
Attendance: 24,151
Referee: Tony Chapron (France)
4 August 2010
20:45

PAOK (Greece)	3–3	(Netherlands) Ajax
Vieirinha 16'; Salpingidis 56'; Ivić 90+1'	Report	Suárez 48'; De Jong 50'; Lindgren 55'

Toumba Stadium, Thessaloniki
Attendance: 24,109
Referee: Carlos Velasco Carballo (Spain)

4–4 on aggregate; Ajax won on away goals.

27 July 2010
19:00

Dynamo Kyiv (Ukraine)	3–0	(Belgium) Gent
Yarmolenko 19'; Shevchenko 80'; Zozulya 90+2'	Report

Valeriy Lobanovskyi Dynamo Stadium, Kyiv
Attendance: 14,503
Referee: Willie Collum (Scotland)
4 August 2010
20:30

Gent (Belgium)	1–3	(Ukraine) Dynamo Kyiv
Coulibaly 85'	Report	Harmash 32'; Milevskyi 55'; Husyev 90'

Jules Ottenstadion, Ghent
Attendance: 6,049
Referee: Cüneyt Çakır (Turkey)

Dynamo Kyiv won 6–1 on aggregate.

28 July 2010
20:15

Young Boys (Switzerland)	2–2	(Turkey) Fenerbahçe
Dudar 18'; Costanzo 89' (pen.)	Report	Emre 5'; Stoch 42'

Stade de Suisse, Bern
Attendance: 19,091
Referee: Svein Oddvar Moen (Norway)
4 August 2010
20:15

Fenerbahçe (Turkey)	0–1	(Switzerland) Young Boys
	Report	Bienvenu 40'

Şükrü Saracoğlu Stadium, Istanbul
Attendance: 35,260
Referee: Aleksei Nikolaev (Russia)

Young Boys won 3–2 on aggregate.

28 July 2010
21:00

Braga (Portugal)	3–0	(Scotland) Celtic
Alan 26' (pen.); Elderson 76'; Matheus 88'	Report

Estádio Municipal, Braga
Attendance: 12,295
Referee: Serge Gumienny (Belgium)
4 August 2010
20:45

Celtic (Scotland)	2–1	(Portugal) Braga
Hooper 52'; Juárez 79'	Report	Paulo César 20'

Celtic Park, Glasgow
Attendance: 53,592
Referee: Ivan Bebek (Croatia)

Braga won 4–2 on aggregate.

27 July 2010
19:30

Unirea Urziceni (Romania)	0–0	(Russia) Zenit Saint Petersburg
	Report

Stadionul Steaua, Bucharest (Note: Played in Bucharest at Stadionul Steaua as Unirea Urziceni's Stadionul Tineretului did not meet UEFA criteria.)
Attendance: 12,000
Referee: Bruno Paixão (Portugal)
4 August 2010
18:30

Zenit Saint Petersburg (Russia)	1–0	(Romania) Unirea Urziceni
Danny 33'	Report

Petrovsky Stadium, Saint Petersburg
Attendance: 21,100
Referee: Mike Dean (England)

Zenit Saint Petersburg won 1–0 on aggregate.

== Play-off round ==
=== Seeding ===
Champions Path		Non-Champions Path	
Seeded	Unseeded	Seeded	Unseeded
(Switzerland) Basel (Belgium) Anderlecht (Denmark) Copenhagen (Israel) Hapoel Tel Aviv (Czech Republic) Sparta Prague	(Norway) Rosenborg (Austria) Red Bull Salzburg (Serbia) Partizan (Slovakia) Žilina (Moldova) Sheriff Tiraspol	(Spain) Sevilla (Germany) Werder Bremen (Russia) Zenit Saint Petersburg (England) Tottenham Hotspur (Netherlands) Ajax	(Ukraine) Dynamo Kyiv (Portugal) Braga (Italy) Sampdoria (France) Auxerre (Switzerland) Young Boys

=== Summary ===
Team 1	Agg.	Team 2	1st leg	2nd leg
Champions Path
Red Bull Salzburg (Austria)	3–4	(Israel) Hapoel Tel Aviv	2–3	1–1
Rosenborg (Norway)	2–2 (a)	(Denmark) Copenhagen	2–1	0–1
Basel (Switzerland)	4–0	(Moldova) Sheriff Tiraspol	1–0	3–0
Sparta Prague (Czech Republic)	0–3	(Slovakia) Žilina	0–2	0–1
Partizan (Serbia)	4–4 (3–2 p)	(Belgium) Anderlecht	2–2	2–2 (a.e.t.)
Non-Champions Path
Young Boys (Switzerland)	3–6	(England) Tottenham Hotspur	3–2	0–4
Braga (Portugal)	5–3	(Spain) Sevilla	1–0	4–3
Werder Bremen (Germany)	5–4	(Italy) Sampdoria	3–1	2–3 (a.e.t.)
Zenit Saint Petersburg (Russia)	1–2	(France) Auxerre	1–0	0–2
Dynamo Kyiv (Ukraine)	2–3	(Netherlands) Ajax	1–1	1–2

=== Champions Path matches ===
18 August 2010
20:45

Red Bull Salzburg (Austria)	2–3	(Israel) Hapoel Tel Aviv
Pokrivač 28'; Wallner 67' (pen.)	Report	Enyeama 3' (pen.); Sahar 44'; Shechter 53'

Red Bull Arena, Wals-Siezenheim
Attendance: 18,900
Referee: Pedro Proença (Portugal)
24 August 2010
20:45

Hapoel Tel Aviv (Israel)	1–1	(Austria) Red Bull Salzburg
Zahavi 90+2'	Report	Douglas da Silva 42' (o.g.)

Bloomfield Stadium, Tel Aviv
Attendance: 13,348
Referee: Pieter Vink (Netherlands)

Hapoel Tel Aviv won 4–3 on aggregate.

17 August 2010
20:45

Rosenborg (Norway)	2–1	(Denmark) Copenhagen
Iversen 23'; Henriksen 57'	Report	Grønkjær 84'

Lerkendal Stadion, Trondheim
Attendance: 18,822
Referee: Gianluca Rocchi (Italy)
25 August 2010
20:45

Copenhagen (Denmark)	1–0	(Norway) Rosenborg
Ottesen 33'	Report

Parken Stadium, Copenhagen
Attendance: 31,180
Referee: Felix Brych (Germany)

2–2 on aggregate; Copenhagen won on away goals.

18 August 2010
20:45

Basel (Switzerland)	1–0	(Moldova) Sheriff Tiraspol
Stocker 54'	Report

St. Jakob-Park, Basel
Attendance: 13,460
Referee: Terje Hauge (Norway)
24 August 2010
20:45

Sheriff Tiraspol (Moldova)	0–3	(Switzerland) Basel
	Report	Streller 74'; Frei 80', 87'

Sheriff Stadium, Tiraspol
Attendance: 12,300
Referee: Martin Hansson (Sweden)

Basel won 4–0 on aggregate.

17 August 2010
20:45

Sparta Prague (Czech Republic)	0–2	(Slovakia) Žilina
	Report	Ceesay 51'; Oravec 73'

Generali Arena, Prague
Attendance: 18,744
Referee: Martin Atkinson (England)
25 August 2010
20:45

Žilina (Slovakia)	1–0	(Czech Republic) Sparta Prague
Ceesay 18'	Report

Štadión pod Dubňom, Žilina
Attendance: 10,892
Referee: Olegário Benquerença (Portugal)

Žilina won 3–0 on aggregate.

18 August 2010
20:45

Partizan (Serbia)	2–2	(Belgium) Anderlecht
Cléo 57'; Lecjaks 64' (o.g.)	Report	Gillet 54'; Juhász 66'

Stadion FK Partizan, Belgrade
Attendance: 28,565
Referee: Claus Bo Larsen (Denmark)
24 August 2010
20:45

Anderlecht (Belgium)	2–2 (a.e.t.)	(Serbia) Partizan
Lukaku 64'; Gillet 71'	Report	Cléo 15', 53'
Penalties
Suárez (penalty missed); Biglia (penalty missed); Gillet (penalty scored); Legear (penalty scored); Boussoufa (penalty missed)	2–3	(penalty scored) Cléo; (penalty missed) Krstajić; (penalty scored) Petrović; (penalty missed) Davidov; (penalty scored) Stanković

Constant Vanden Stock Stadium, Brussels
Attendance: 19,551
Referee: Craig Thomson (Scotland)

4–4 on aggregate; Partizan won 3–2 on penalties.

=== Non-Champions Path matches ===
17 August 2010
20:45

Young Boys (Switzerland)	3–2	(England) Tottenham Hotspur
Lulić 4'; Bienvenu 13'; Hochstrasser 28'	Report	Bassong 42'; Pavlyuchenko 83'

Stade de Suisse, Bern
Attendance: 30,166
Referee: Frank De Bleeckere (Belgium)
25 August 2010
20:45

Tottenham Hotspur (England)	4–0	(Switzerland) Young Boys
Crouch 5', 61', 78' (pen.); Defoe 32'	Report

White Hart Lane, London
Attendance: 34,709
Referee: Laurent Duhamel (France)

Tottenham Hotspur won 6–3 on aggregate.

18 August 2010
20:45

Braga (Portugal)	1–0	(Spain) Sevilla
Matheus 62'	Report

Estádio Municipal, Braga
Attendance: 16,646
Referee: Wolfgang Stark (Germany)
24 August 2010
20:45

Sevilla (Spain)	3–4	(Portugal) Braga
Luís Fabiano 60'; Navas 84'; Kanouté 90+1'	Report	Matheus 31'; Lima 58', 85', 90'

Ramón Sánchez Pizjuán, Seville
Attendance: 31,348
Referee: Nicola Rizzoli (Italy)

Braga won 5–3 on aggregate.

18 August 2010
20:45

Werder Bremen (Germany)	3–1	(Italy) Sampdoria
Fritz 51'; Frings 67' (pen.); Pizarro 69'	Report	Pazzini 90'

Weserstadion, Bremen
Attendance: 25,276
Referee: Stéphane Lannoy (France)
24 August 2010
20:45

Sampdoria (Italy)	3–2 (a.e.t.)	(Germany) Werder Bremen
Pazzini 8', 13'; Cassano 85'	Report	Rosenberg 90+3'; Pizarro 100'

Stadio Luigi Ferraris, Genoa
Attendance: 27,574
Referee: Viktor Kassai (Hungary)

Werder Bremen won 5–4 on aggregate.

17 August 2010
18:30

Zenit Saint Petersburg (Russia)	1–0	(France) Auxerre
Kerzhakov 3'	Report

Petrovsky Stadium, Saint Petersburg
Attendance: 21,405
Referee: Björn Kuipers (Netherlands)
25 August 2010
20:45

Auxerre (France)	2–0	(Russia) Zenit Saint Petersburg
Hengbart 9'; Jeleń 53'	Report

Stade de l'Abbé-Deschamps, Auxerre
Attendance: 15,277
Referee: Damir Skomina (Slovenia)

Auxerre won 2–1 on aggregate.

17 August 2010
20:45

Dynamo Kyiv (Ukraine)	1–1	(Netherlands) Ajax
Husyev 66'	Report	Vertonghen 57'

Valeriy Lobanovskyi Dynamo Stadium, Kyiv
Attendance: 16,500
Referee: Massimo Busacca (Switzerland)
25 August 2010
20:45

Ajax (Netherlands)	2–1	(Ukraine) Dynamo Kyiv
Suárez 43'; El Hamdaoui 75'	Report	Shevchenko 84' (pen.)

Amsterdam Arena, Amsterdam
Attendance: 50,249
Referee: Alberto Undiano Mallenco (Spain)

Ajax won 3–2 on aggregate.
