= 2009 Faroe Islands Premier League =

Faroe Islands Premier League
- Season: 2009
- Champions: HB Tórshavn; 20th title
- Relegated: KÍ Klaksvík; 07 Vestur
- Champions League: HB Tórshavn
- Europa League: EB/Streymur; Víkingur (via dom. cup); NSÍ Runavík
- Matches played: 135
- Goals scored: 450 (3.33 per match)
- Top goalscorer: Finnur Justinussen (19)
- Biggest home win: EB/Streymur 7–0 KÍ
- Biggest away win: 07 Vestur 1–4 NSÍ; AB 0–3 B68; EB/Streymur 0–3 AB; AB 0–3 EB/Streymur
- Highest scoring: 07 Vestur 3–5 EB/Streymur; Víkingur 6–2 07 Vestur

2009 Faroe Islands Premier League, also known as Vodafonedeildin for sponsoring reasons, was the sixty-seventh season of top-tier football on the Faroe Islands. It began on 4 April 2009 and ended on 3 October 2009. EB/Streymur were the defending champions. The league was won by HB Tórshavn.

== Team changes from the previous season ==
B71 Sandoy and Skála ÍF were relegated to 1. deild after finishing 9th and 10th in the 2008 season. They were replaced by 1. deild champions 07 Vestur and runners-up AB Argir.

== Overview ==
Location of teams in Faroe Islands Premier League 2009

| Team | City | Stadium | Capacity | Manager |
|---|---|---|---|---|
| 07 Vestur | Sørvágur | á Dungasandi | 2,000 | (Poland) Piotr Krakowski |
| AB | Argir | Inni í Vika | 2,000 | (Faroe Islands) Allan Mørkøre |
| B36 | Tórshavn | Gundadalur | 5,000 | (Serbia) Milan Cimburovic |
| B68 | Toftir | Svangaskarð | 1,200 | (Faroe Islands) Bill McLeod Jacobsen |
| EB/Streymur | Streymnes | við Margáir | 1,000 | (Faroe Islands) Heðin Askham |
| HB | Tórshavn | Gundadalur | 5,000 | (Faroe Islands) Sámal Erik Hentze |
| ÍF | Fuglafjørður | í Fløtugerði | 3,000 | (Faroe Islands) Jón Simonsen |
| KÍ | Klaksvík | Injector Arena | 3,000 | (Serbia) Aleksandar Djordjević (Faroe Islands) Jákup Mikkelsen |
| NSÍ | Runavík | við Løkin | 2,000 | (Faroe Islands) Pauli Poulsen |
| Víkingur | Norðragøta | Sarpugerði | 2,000 | (Faroe Islands) Anton Skorðadal |

== League table ==
| Pos | Team | Pld | W | D | L | GF | GA | GD | Pts | Qualification or relegation |
|---|---|---|---|---|---|---|---|---|---|---|
| 1 | HB (C) | 27 | 16 | 7 | 4 | 59 | 37 | +22 | 55 | Qualification for the Champions League second qualifying round |
| 2 | EB/Streymur | 27 | 15 | 5 | 7 | 56 | 34 | +22 | 50 | Qualification for the Europa League first qualifying round |
| 3 | Víkingur Gøta | 27 | 14 | 5 | 8 | 51 | 36 | +15 | 47 | Qualification for the Europa League second qualifying round (Note: Vikingur have won the 2009 Faroe Islands Cup competition and have qualified for the second qualifying round of the UEFA Europa League.) |
| 4 | NSÍ Runavík | 27 | 13 | 5 | 9 | 56 | 46 | +10 | 44 | Qualification for the Europa League first qualifying round |
| 5 | B68 Toftir | 27 | 12 | 7 | 8 | 48 | 41 | +7 | 43 | |
| 6 | AB | 27 | 9 | 7 | 11 | 29 | 35 | −6 | 34 | |
| 7 | ÍF | 27 | 8 | 6 | 13 | 45 | 48 | −3 | 30 | |
| 8 | B36 Tórshavn | 27 | 7 | 7 | 13 | 37 | 53 | −16 | 28 | |
| 9 | KÍ (R) | 27 | 6 | 6 | 15 | 30 | 57 | −27 | 24 | Relegation to 1. deild |
| 10 | 07 Vestur (R) | 27 | 4 | 7 | 16 | 39 | 63 | −24 | 19 | Relegation to 1. deild |

Source: soccerandequipment.com
Rules for classification: 1) points; 2) goal difference; 3) number of goals scored.
(C) Champions; (R) Relegated

== Results ==
The schedule consisted of a total of 27 games. Each team played three games against every opponent in no particular order. At least one of the games was at home and one was away. The additional home game for every match-up was randomly assigned prior to the season.

=== Regular home games ===
| Home \ Away | 07V | AB | B36 | B68 | EBS | HB | ÍF | KÍ | NSÍ | VÍK |
|---|---|---|---|---|---|---|---|---|---|---|
| 07 Vestur | | 0–0 | 4–2 | 1–0 | 3–5 | 2–3 | 1–1 | 1–3 | 1–4 | 0–0 |
| Argja Bóltfelag | 2–2 | | 3–1 | 0–3 | 1–1 | 0–0 | 2–0 | 0–2 | 3–1 | 0–1 |
| B36 Tórshavn | 2–1 | 3–2 | | 0–2 | 1–3 | 2–2 | 0–0 | 1–0 | 2–3 | 1–3 |
| B68 Toftir | 2–1 | 1–0 | 3–0 | | 3–2 | 3–3 | 2–1 | 2–0 | 2–2 | 2–2 |
| EB/Streymur | 2–1 | 0–3 | 0–0 | 3–0 | | 2–3 | 2–2 | 7–0 | 3–4 | 1–0 |
| Havnar Bóltfelag | 4–3 | 4–0 | 2–2 | 3–1 | 1–0 | | 0–0 | 4–2 | 5–2 | 2–1 |
| ÍF Fuglafjørður | 3–0 | 3–0 | 1–2 | 3–2 | 3–1 | 1–3 | | 1–0 | 1–2 | 1–2 |
| KÍ Klaksvík | 2–2 | 0–1 | 2–2 | 2–4 | 0–0 | 0–2 | 3–2 | | 0–2 | 2–2 |
| NSÍ Runavík | 5–1 | 0–1 | 3–0 | 2–2 | 1–2 | 2–1 | 4–1 | 1–1 | | 1–2 |
| Víkingur Gøta | 6–2 | 1–0 | 3–1 | 3–3 | 0–2 | 2–3 | 2–0 | 4–1 | 1–0 | |

Source: soccerandequipment.com
Legend: Blue = home team win; Yellow = draw; Red = away team win.

=== Additional home games ===
| Home \ Away | 07V | AB | B36 | B68 | EBS | HB | ÍF | KÍ | NSÍ | VÍK |
|---|---|---|---|---|---|---|---|---|---|---|
| 07 Vestur | | | 2–0 | | | 2–3 | 2–2 | | 2–2 | |
| Argja Bóltfelag | 2–1 | | | | 0–3 | | 4–2 | | | 0–1 |
| B36 Tórshavn | | 0–2 | | 1–1 | | 1–0 | | 2–0 | 5–2 | |
| B68 Toftir | 3–0 | 0–0 | | | | | 5–2 | 0–1 | | |
| EB/Streymur | 1–0 | | 4–1 | 4–0 | | | 3–2 | | 2–2 | |
| Havnar Bóltfelag | | 1–1 | | 3–1 | 0–1 | | | 4–2 | | 1–1 |
| ÍF Fuglafjørður | | | 1–1 | | | 3–0 | | 5–0 | 1–3 | |
| KÍ Klaksvík | 2–1 | 1–1 | | | 0–2 | | | | | 2–0 |
| NSÍ Runavík | | 3–1 | | 0–1 | | 0–2 | | 3–2 | | 2–1 |
| Víkingur Gøta | 2–3 | | 4–3 | 2–0 | 3–0 | | 2–3 | | | |

Source: soccerandequipment.com
Legend: Blue = home team win; Yellow = draw; Red = away team win.

== Top goalscorers ==
19 goals

- (Faroe Islands) Finnur Justinussen (Víkingur Gøta)

17 goals

- (Faroe Islands) Arnbjørn Hansen (EB/Streymur)

15 goals

- (Senegal) Ameth Keita (B68 Toftir)

14 goals

- (Faroe Islands) Andrew av Fløtum (HB Tórshavn)
- (Hungary) Károly Potemkin (NSÍ Runavík)

12 goals

- (Faroe Islands) Hjalgrím Elttør (KÍ Klaksvík (5) / NSÍ Runavík (7))

10 goals

- (Faroe Islands) Fróði Benjaminsen (HB Tórshavn)
- (Faroe Islands) Jens Erik Rasmussen (07 Vestur)

9 goals

- (Faroe Islands) Christian Høgni Jacobsen (NSÍ Runavík)
- (Faroe Islands) Bogi Løkin (NSÍ Runavík)
- (Faroe Islands) Andy Olsen (ÍF Fuglafjørður)
- (Faroe Islands) Rógvi Poulsen (HB Tórshavn)

== See also ==
- 2009 Faroe Islands Cup
