= 2010–11 UEFA Champions League =

European football tournament

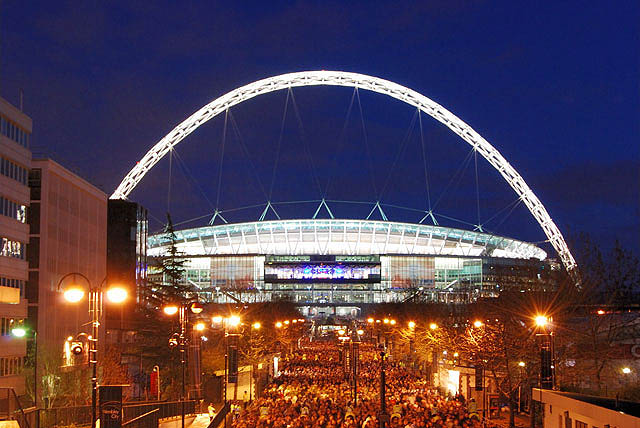
- Wembley Stadium in London hosted the final

Tournament details
- Dates: Qualifying: 29 June – 25 August 2010; Competition proper: 14 September 2010 – 28 May 2011
- Teams: Competition proper: 32; Total: 76 (from 52 associations)

Final positions
- Champions: (Spain) Barcelona (4th title)
- Runners-up: (England) Manchester United

Tournament statistics
- Matches played: 125
- Goals scored: 355 (2.84 per match)
- Top scorer(s): Lionel Messi (Barcelona); 12 goals

The 2010–11 UEFA Champions League was the 56th season of Europe's premier club football tournament organised by UEFA, and the 19th under the UEFA Champions League format. The final was held at Wembley Stadium in London on 28 May 2011, where Barcelona defeated Manchester United 3–1.

Internazionale were the defending champions, but were eliminated by Schalke 04 in the quarter-finals. As winners, Barcelona earned berths in the 2011 UEFA Super Cup and the 2011 FIFA Club World Cup.

== Association team allocation ==
A total of 76 teams participated in the 2010–11 Champions League, from 52 UEFA associations (Liechtenstein organised no domestic league competition). Associations were allocated places according to their 2009 UEFA country coefficient, which took into account their performance in European competitions from 2004–05 to 2008–09.

Below is the qualification scheme for the 2010–11 UEFA Champions League:

- Associations 1–3 each had four teams qualify
- Associations 4–6 each had three teams qualify
- Associations 7–15 each had two teams qualify
- Associations 16–53 each had one team qualify (excluding Liechtenstein)

=== Association ranking ===
Rank	Association	Coeff.	Teams
1	England	79.499	4
2	Spain	74.266	4
3	Italy	62.910	4
4	Germany	56.695	3
5	France	50.168	3
6	Russia	47.625	3
7	Ukraine	41.850	2
8	Netherlands	39.130	2
9	Romania	38.908	2
10	Portugal	36.462	2
11	Turkey	32.225	2
12	Greece	28.165	2
13	Scotland	27.875	2
14	Belgium	25.325	2
15	Switzerland	25.250	2
16	Denmark	24.450	1
17	Bulgaria	21.250	1
18	Czech Republic	20.750	1

Rank	Association	Coeff.	Teams
19	Norway	18.800	1
20	Austria	17.825	1
21	Serbia	15.250	1
22	Israel	15.250	1
23	Cyprus	15.082	1
24	Sweden	14.691	1
25	Slovakia	14.665	1
26	Poland	12.916	1
27	Croatia	12.332	1
28	Finland	9.790	1
29	Lithuania	9.666	1
30	Republic of Ireland	9.499	1
31	Latvia	9.164	1
32	Slovenia	9.082	1
33	Belarus	8.666	1
34	Bosnia and Herzegovina	8.665	1
35	Hungary	8.166	1
36	Iceland	6.665	1

Rank	Association	Coeff.	Teams
37	Moldova	6.665	1
38	Georgia	6.664	1
39	Liechtenstein	5.500	0
40	Macedonia	5.165	1
41	Azerbaijan	4.498	1
42	Estonia	4.332	1
43	Albania	3.999	1
44	Kazakhstan	3.249	1
45	Armenia	2.999	1
46	Wales	2.331	1
47	Northern Ireland	2.165	1
48	Faroe Islands	2.165	1
49	Luxembourg	1.332	1
50	Montenegro	1.000	1
51	Andorra	0.500	1
52	Malta	0.499	1
53	San Marino	0.250	1

=== Distribution ===
Since the winners of the 2009–10 UEFA Champions League, Internazionale, obtained a place in the group stage through their domestic league placing, the reserved title holder spot in the group stage was effectively vacated. To compensate:

- The champions of association 13 (Scotland) were promoted from the third qualifying round to the group stage.
- The champions of association 16 (Denmark) were promoted from the second qualifying round to the third qualifying round.
- The champions of associations 48 and 49 (Faroe Islands and Luxembourg) were promoted from the first qualifying round to the second qualifying round.

		Teams entering in this round	Teams advancing from previous round
First qualifying round (4 teams)		4 champions from associations 50–53	
Second qualifying round (34 teams)		32 champions from associations 17–49 (except Liechtenstein)	2 winners from the first qualifying round
Third qualifying round	Champions (20 teams)	3 champions from associations 14–16	17 winners from the second qualifying round
Third qualifying round	Non-champions (10 teams)	9 runners-up from associations 7–15; 1 third-placed team from association 6	
Play-off round	Champions (10 teams)		10 winners from the third qualifying round for champions
Play-off round	Non-champions (10 teams)	2 third-placed teams from associations 4 and 5; 3 fourth-placed teams from associations 1–3	5 winners from the third qualifying round for non-champions
Group stage (32 teams)		13 champions from associations 1–13; 6 runners-up from associations 1–6; 3 third-placed teams from associations 1–3	5 winners from the play-off round for champions; 5 winners from the play-off round for non-champions
Knockout phase (16 teams)			8 group winners from the group stage; 8 group runners-up from the group stage

=== Teams ===
The labels in the parentheses show how each team qualified for the place of its starting round:

- TH: Champions League title holders
- 1st, 2nd, 3rd, 4th: League positions of the previous season

Group stage
(Italy) Internazionale (1st)^{TH}	(Spain) Valencia (3rd)	(France) Lyon (2nd)	(Romania) CFR Cluj (1st)
(England) Chelsea (1st)	(Italy) Roma (2nd)	(Russia) Rubin Kazan (1st)	(Portugal) Benfica (1st)
(England) Manchester United (2nd)	(Italy) Milan (3rd)	(Russia) Spartak Moscow (2nd)	(Turkey) Bursaspor (1st)
(England) Arsenal (3rd)	(Germany) Bayern Munich (1st)	(Ukraine) Shakhtar Donetsk (1st)	(Greece) Panathinaikos (1st)
(Spain) Barcelona (1st)	(Germany) Schalke 04 (2nd)	(Netherlands) Twente (1st)	(Scotland) Rangers (1st)
(Spain) Real Madrid (2nd)	(France) Marseille (1st)		
Play-off round
Champions	Non-champions		
	(England) Tottenham Hotspur (4th)	(Italy) Sampdoria (4th)	(France) Auxerre (3rd)
	(Spain) Sevilla (4th)	(Germany) Werder Bremen (3rd)	
Third qualifying round
Champions	Non-champions		
(Belgium) Anderlecht (1st)	(Russia) Zenit Saint Petersburg (3rd)	(Portugal) Braga (2nd)	(Scotland) Celtic (2nd)
(Switzerland) Basel (1st)	(Ukraine) Dynamo Kyiv (2nd)	(Turkey) Fenerbahçe (2nd)	(Belgium) Gent (2nd)
(Denmark) Copenhagen (1st)	(Netherlands) Ajax (2nd)	(Greece) PAOK (2nd)	(Switzerland) Young Boys (2nd)
	(Romania) Unirea Urziceni (2nd)		
Second qualifying round
(Bulgaria) Litex Lovech (1st)	(Slovakia) Žilina (1st)	(Belarus) BATE Borisov (1st)	(Estonia) Levadia Tallinn (1st)
(Czech Republic) Sparta Prague (1st)	(Poland) Lech Poznań (1st)	(Bosnia and Herzegovina) Željezničar (1st)	(Albania) Dinamo Tirana (1st)
(Norway) Rosenborg (1st)	(Croatia) Dinamo Zagreb (1st)	(Hungary) Debrecen (1st)	(Kazakhstan) Aktobe (1st)
(Austria) Red Bull Salzburg (1st)	(Finland) HJK (1st)	(Iceland) FH (1st)	(Armenia) Pyunik (1st)
(Serbia) Partizan (1st)	(Lithuania) Ekranas (1st)	(Moldova) Sheriff Tiraspol (1st)	(Wales) The New Saints (1st)
(Israel) Hapoel Tel Aviv (1st)	(Republic of Ireland) Bohemians (1st)	(Georgia (country)) Olimpi Rustavi (1st)	(Northern Ireland) Linfield (1st)
(Cyprus) Omonia (1st)	(Latvia) Liepājas Metalurgs (1st)	(North Macedonia) Renova (1st)	(Faroe Islands) HB (1st)
(Sweden) AIK (1st)	(Slovenia) Koper (1st)	(Azerbaijan) Inter Baku (1st)	(Luxembourg) Jeunesse Esch (1st)
First qualifying round
(Montenegro) Rudar Pljevlja (1st)	(Andorra) FC Santa Coloma (1st)	(Malta) Birkirkara (1st)	(San Marino) Tre Fiori (1st)

== Round and draw dates ==
All draws held at UEFA headquarters in Nyon, Switzerland unless stated otherwise.

Phase	Round	Draw date	First leg	Second leg
Qualifying	First qualifying round	21 June 2010	29–30 June 2010	6–7 July 2010
Qualifying	Second qualifying round	21 June 2010	13–14 July 2010	20–21 July 2010
Qualifying	Third qualifying round	16 July 2010	27–28 July 2010	3–4 August 2010
Play-off	Play-off round	6 August 2010	17–18 August 2010	24–25 August 2010
Group stage	Matchday 1	26 August 2010 (Monaco)	14–15 September 2010	
Group stage	Matchday 2	26 August 2010 (Monaco)	28–29 September 2010	
Group stage	Matchday 3	26 August 2010 (Monaco)	19–20 October 2010	
Group stage	Matchday 4	26 August 2010 (Monaco)	2–3 November 2010	
Group stage	Matchday 5	26 August 2010 (Monaco)	23–24 November 2010	
Group stage	Matchday 6	26 August 2010 (Monaco)	7–8 December 2010	
Knockout phase	Round of 16	17 December 2010	15–16 & 22–23 February 2011	8–9 & 15–16 March 2011
Knockout phase	Quarter-finals	18 March 2011	5–6 April 2011	12–13 April 2011
Knockout phase	Semi-finals	18 March 2011	26–27 April 2011	3–4 May 2011
Knockout phase	Final	18 March 2011	28 May 2011 at Wembley Stadium, London	

== Seeding ==
The draws for the qualifying rounds, the play-off round and the group stage were all seeded based on the 2010 UEFA club coefficients. The coefficients were calculated on the basis of a combination of 20% of the value of the respective national association's coefficient for the period from 2005–06 to 2009–10 inclusive and the clubs' individual performances in the UEFA club competitions during the same period. Clubs were ordered by their coefficients and then divided into pots as required.

In the draws for the qualifying rounds and the play-off round, the teams were divided evenly into one seeded and one unseeded pot, based on their club coefficients. A seeded team was drawn against an unseeded team, with the order of legs in each tie also being decided randomly. Due to the limited time between matches, the draws for the second and third qualifying rounds took place before the results of the previous round were known. The seeding in each draw was carried out under the assumption that all of the highest-ranked clubs of the previous round were victorious. If a lower-ranked club was victorious, it simply took the place of its defeated opponent in the next round. Moreover, in the third qualifying round and play-off round, champion clubs and non-champion clubs were kept separated. Prior to these draws, UEFA could form "groups" in accordance with the principles set by the Club Competitions Committee, but they were purely for convenience of the draw and did not resemble any real groupings in the sense of the competition, while ensuring that teams from the same association were not drawn against each other.

In the draw for the group stage, the 32 teams were split into four pots of eight teams, based on their club coefficients, with the title holder automatically placed into Pot 1. Each group contained one team from each pot, but teams from the same association could not be drawn into the same group. The draw was controlled in order to split teams of the same national association evenly between Groups A-D and Groups E-H, where the two sets of groups alternated between playing on Tuesdays and Wednesdays for each matchday.

In the draw for the first knockout round, the eight group winners were seeded, and the eight group runners-up were unseeded. A seeded team was drawn against an unseeded team, with the seeded team hosting the second leg. Teams from the same group or the same association could not be drawn against each other.

In the draws for the quarter-finals onwards, there were no seedings, and teams from the same group or the same association could be drawn with each other.

== Qualifying rounds ==
In the qualifying and play-off rounds, teams played against each other over two legs on a home-and-away basis.

The draws for the first two qualifying rounds were held on 21 June 2010 by UEFA General Secretary Gianni Infantino and Michael Heselschwerdt, Head of Club Competitions, while the draw for the third qualifying round was held on 16 July 2010 by UEFA General Secretary Gianni Infantino and Giorgio Marchetti, Competitions Director.

=== First qualifying round ===
The first legs were planned to be played on 29 and 30 June, and the second legs were played on 6 and 7 July 2010. However, the first match of the entire competition (FC Santa Coloma v Birkirkara on 29 June) was cancelled due to the pitch being declared unfit.

Team 1	Agg.	Team 2	1st leg	2nd leg
Tre Fiori (San Marino)	1–7	(Montenegro) Rudar Pljevlja	0–3	1–4
FC Santa Coloma (Andorra)	3–7	(Malta) Birkirkara	0–3 (Note: Match originally postponed due to bad pitch conditions caused by heavy rain. FC Santa Coloma suggested an alternative on 30 June, but UEFA awarded Birkirkara a 3–0 away win on 1 July.)	3–4

=== Second qualifying round ===
The first legs were played on 13 and 14 July, and the second legs were played on 20 and 21 July 2010.

Team 1	Agg.	Team 2	1st leg	2nd leg
Liepājas Metalurgs (Latvia)	0–5	(Czech Republic) Sparta Prague	0–3	0–2
Aktobe (Kazakhstan)	3–1	(Georgia (country)) Olimpi Rustavi	2–0	1–1
Levadia Tallinn (Estonia)	3–4	(Hungary) Debrecen	1–1	2–3
Partizan (Serbia)	4–1	(Armenia) Pyunik	3–1	1–0
Inter Baku (Azerbaijan)	1–1 (8–9 p)	(Poland) Lech Poznań	0–1	1–0 (a.e.t.)
Dinamo Zagreb (Croatia)	5–4	(Slovenia) Koper	5–1	0–3
Litex Lovech (Bulgaria)	5–0	(Montenegro) Rudar Pljevlja	1–0	4–0
Birkirkara (Malta)	1–3	(Slovakia) Žilina	1–0	0–3
Sheriff Tiraspol (Moldova)	3–2	(Albania) Dinamo Tirana	3–1	0–1
Hapoel Tel Aviv (Israel)	6–0	(Bosnia and Herzegovina) Željezničar	5–0	1–0
Omonia (Cyprus)	5–0	(North Macedonia) Renova	3–0	2–0
Red Bull Salzburg (Austria)	5–1	(Faroe Islands) HB	5–0	0–1
Bohemians (Republic of Ireland)	1–4	(Wales) The New Saints	1–0	0–4
BATE Borisov (Belarus)	6–1	(Iceland) FH	5–1	1–0
AIK (Sweden)	1–0	(Luxembourg) Jeunesse Esch	1–0	0–0
Linfield (Northern Ireland)	0–2	(Norway) Rosenborg	0–0	0–2
Ekranas (Lithuania)	1–2	(Finland) HJK	1–0	0–2 (a.e.t.)

=== Third qualifying round ===
The third qualifying round was split into two separate sections: one for champions and one for non-champions. The losing teams in both sections entered the play-off round of the 2010–11 UEFA Europa League. The first legs were played on 27 and 28 July, and the second legs were played on 3 and 4 August 2010.

Team 1	Agg.	Team 2	1st leg	2nd leg
Champions Path
Sparta Prague (Czech Republic)	2–0	(Poland) Lech Poznań	1–0	1–0
Aktobe (Kazakhstan)	2–3	(Israel) Hapoel Tel Aviv	1–0	1–3
Sheriff Tiraspol (Moldova)	2–2 (6–5 p)	(Croatia) Dinamo Zagreb	1–1	1–1 (a.e.t.)
Litex Lovech (Bulgaria)	2–4	(Slovakia) Žilina	1–1	1–3
Debrecen (Hungary)	1–5	(Switzerland) Basel	0–2	1–3
AIK (Sweden)	0–4	(Norway) Rosenborg	0–1	0–3
Partizan (Serbia)	5–1	(Finland) HJK	3–0	2–1
BATE Borisov (Belarus)	2–3	(Denmark) Copenhagen	0–0	2–3
The New Saints (Wales)	1–6	(Belgium) Anderlecht	1–3	0–3
Omonia (Cyprus)	2–5	(Austria) Red Bull Salzburg	1–1	1–4
Non-Champions Path
Ajax (Netherlands)	4–4 (a)	(Greece) PAOK	1–1	3–3
Dynamo Kyiv (Ukraine)	6–1	(Belgium) Gent	3–0	3–1
Young Boys (Switzerland)	3–2	(Turkey) Fenerbahçe	2–2	1–0
Braga (Portugal)	4–2	(Scotland) Celtic	3–0	1–2
Unirea Urziceni (Romania)	0–1	(Russia) Zenit Saint Petersburg	0–0	0–1

== Play-off round ==
The draw for the play-off round was held on 6 August 2010 by UEFA General Secretary Gianni Infantino and UEFA Competitions Director Giorgio Marchetti. The play-off round was split into two separate sections: one for champions and one for non-champions. The losing teams in both sections entered the group stage of the 2010–11 UEFA Europa League. The first legs were played on 17 and 18 August, and the second legs were played on 24 and 25 August 2010.

Following a trial at the previous year's UEFA Europa League, UEFA announced that in both the 2010–11 and 2011–12 competitions, two extra officials would be used – with one on each goal line.

Team 1	Agg.	Team 2	1st leg	2nd leg
Champions Path
Red Bull Salzburg (Austria)	3–4	(Israel) Hapoel Tel Aviv	2–3	1–1
Rosenborg (Norway)	2–2 (a)	(Denmark) Copenhagen	2–1	0–1
Basel (Switzerland)	4–0	(Moldova) Sheriff Tiraspol	1–0	3–0
Sparta Prague (Czech Republic)	0–3	(Slovakia) Žilina	0–2	0–1
Partizan (Serbia)	4–4 (3–2 p)	(Belgium) Anderlecht	2–2	2–2 (a.e.t.)
Non-Champions Path
Young Boys (Switzerland)	3–6	(England) Tottenham Hotspur	3–2	0–4
Braga (Portugal)	5–3	(Spain) Sevilla	1–0	4–3
Werder Bremen (Germany)	5–4	(Italy) Sampdoria	3–1	2–3 (a.e.t.)
Zenit Saint Petersburg (Russia)	1–2	(France) Auxerre	1–0	0–2
Dynamo Kyiv (Ukraine)	2–3	(Netherlands) Ajax	1–1	1–2

== Group stage ==
Location of teams of the 2010–11 UEFA Champions League group stage.
Brown: Group A; Red: Group B; Orange: Group C; Yellow: Group D;
Green: Group E; Blue: Group F; Purple: Group G; Pink: Group H.

The 32 clubs were drawn into eight groups of four on 26 August 2010 in Monaco. In each group, teams played against each other home-and-away in a round-robin format. The matchdays were 14–15 September, 28–29 September, 19–20 October, 2–3 November, 23–24 November, and 7–8 December 2010. The group winners and runners-up advanced to the round of 16, while the third-placed teams entered the round of 32 of the 2010–11 UEFA Europa League.

If two or more teams were equal on points on completion of the group matches, the following criteria were applied to determine the rankings (in descending order):

1. higher number of points obtained in the group matches played among the teams in question;
2. superior goal difference from the group matches played among the teams in question;
3. higher number of goals scored away from home in the group matches played among the teams in question;
4. superior goal difference from all group matches played;
5. higher number of goals scored;
6. higher number of coefficient points accumulated by the club in question, as well as its association, over the previous five seasons.

Braga, Bursaspor, Hapoel Tel Aviv, Tottenham Hotspur, Twente and Žilina all made their debuts in the group stage.

=== Group A ===
Pos	Team	Pld	W	D	L	GF	GA	GD	Pts	Qualification	TOT	INT	TWE	BRM
1	(England) Tottenham Hotspur	6	3	2	1	18	11	+7	11	Advance to knockout phase	—	3–1	4–1	3–0
2	(Italy) Internazionale	6	3	1	2	12	11	+1	10	Advance to knockout phase	4–3	—	1–0	4–0
3	(Netherlands) Twente	6	1	3	2	9	11	−2	6	Transfer to Europa League	3–3	2–2	—	1–1
4	(Germany) Werder Bremen	6	1	2	3	6	12	−6	5		2–2	3–0	0–2	—

Source: Soccerway

=== Group B ===
Pos	Team	Pld	W	D	L	GF	GA	GD	Pts	Qualification	SCH	LYO	BEN	HTA
1	(Germany) Schalke 04	6	4	1	1	10	3	+7	13	Advance to knockout phase	—	3–0	2–0	3–1
2	(France) Lyon	6	3	1	2	11	10	+1	10	Advance to knockout phase	1–0	—	2–0	2–2
3	(Portugal) Benfica	6	2	0	4	7	12	−5	6	Transfer to Europa League	1–2	4–3	—	2–0
4	(Israel) Hapoel Tel Aviv	6	1	2	3	7	10	−3	5		0–0	1–3	3–0	—

Source: Soccerway

=== Group C ===
Pos	Team	Pld	W	D	L	GF	GA	GD	Pts	Qualification	MUN	VAL	RAN	BUR
1	(England) Manchester United	6	4	2	0	7	1	+6	14	Advance to knockout phase	—	1–1	0–0	1–0
2	(Spain) Valencia	6	3	2	1	15	4	+11	11	Advance to knockout phase	0–1	—	3–0	6–1
3	(Scotland) Rangers	6	1	3	2	3	6	−3	6	Transfer to Europa League	0–1	1–1	—	1–0
4	(Turkey) Bursaspor	6	0	1	5	2	16	−14	1		0–3	0–4	1–1	—

Source: Soccerway

=== Group D ===
Pos	Team	Pld	W	D	L	GF	GA	GD	Pts	Qualification	BAR	CPH	RUB	PAN
1	(Spain) Barcelona	6	4	2	0	14	3	+11	14	Advance to knockout phase	—	2–0	2–0	5–1
2	(Denmark) Copenhagen	6	3	1	2	7	5	+2	10	Advance to knockout phase	1–1	—	1–0	3–1
3	(Russia) Rubin Kazan	6	1	3	2	2	4	−2	6	Transfer to Europa League	1–1	1–0	—	0–0
4	(Greece) Panathinaikos	6	0	2	4	2	13	−11	2		0–3	0–2	0–0	—

Source: Soccerway

=== Group E ===
Pos	Team	Pld	W	D	L	GF	GA	GD	Pts	Qualification	BAY	ROM	BSL	CLJ
1	(Germany) Bayern Munich	6	5	0	1	16	6	+10	15	Advance to knockout phase	—	2–0	3–0	3–2
2	(Italy) Roma	6	3	1	2	10	11	−1	10	Advance to knockout phase	3–2	—	1–3	2–1
3	(Switzerland) Basel	6	2	0	4	8	11	−3	6	Transfer to Europa League	1–2	2–3	—	1–0
4	(Romania) CFR Cluj	6	1	1	4	6	12	−6	4		0–4	1–1	2–1	—

Source: Soccerway

=== Group F ===
Pos	Team	Pld	W	D	L	GF	GA	GD	Pts	Qualification	CHE	MAR	SPM	ZIL
1	(England) Chelsea	6	5	0	1	14	4	+10	15	Advance to knockout phase	—	2–0	4–1	2–1
2	(France) Marseille	6	4	0	2	12	3	+9	12	Advance to knockout phase	1–0	—	0–1	1–0
3	(Russia) Spartak Moscow	6	3	0	3	7	10	−3	9	Transfer to Europa League	0–2	0–3	—	3–0
4	(Slovakia) Žilina	6	0	0	6	3	19	−16	0		1–4	0–7	1–2	—

Source: Soccerway

=== Group G ===
Pos	Team	Pld	W	D	L	GF	GA	GD	Pts	Qualification	RMA	MIL	AJX	AUX
1	(Spain) Real Madrid	6	5	1	0	15	2	+13	16	Advance to knockout phase	—	2–0	2–0	4–0
2	(Italy) Milan	6	2	2	2	7	7	0	8	Advance to knockout phase	2–2	—	0–2	2–0
3	(Netherlands) Ajax	6	2	1	3	6	10	−4	7	Transfer to Europa League	0–4	1–1	—	2–1
4	(France) Auxerre	6	1	0	5	3	12	−9	3		0–1	0–2	2–1	—

Source: Soccerway

=== Group H ===
Pos	Team	Pld	W	D	L	GF	GA	GD	Pts	Qualification	SHK	ARS	BRA	PTZ
1	(Ukraine) Shakhtar Donetsk	6	5	0	1	12	6	+6	15	Advance to knockout phase	—	2–1	2–0	1–0
2	(England) Arsenal	6	4	0	2	18	7	+11	12	Advance to knockout phase	5–1	—	6–0	3–1
3	(Portugal) Braga	6	3	0	3	5	11	−6	9	Transfer to Europa League	0–3	2–0	—	2–0
4	(Serbia) Partizan	6	0	0	6	2	13	−11	0		0–3	1–3	0–1	—

Source: Soccerway

== Knockout phase ==
In the knockout phase, teams played against each other over two legs on a home-and-away basis, except for the one-match final.

=== Bracket ===
Round of 16
(France) Lyon	1	0	1
(Spain) Real Madrid	1	3	4
(Italy) Milan	0	0	0
(England) Tottenham Hotspur	1	0	1
(England) Arsenal	2	1	3
(Spain) Barcelona	1	3	4
(Italy) Roma	2	0	2
(Ukraine) Shakhtar Donetsk	3	3	6
(Italy) Internazionale (a)	0	3	3
(Germany) Bayern Munich	1	2	3
(Spain) Valencia	1	1	2
(Germany) Schalke 04	1	3	4
(Denmark) Copenhagen	0	0	0
(England) Chelsea	2	0	2
(France) Marseille	0	1	1
(England) Manchester United	0	2	2

Quarter-finals
(Spain) Real Madrid	4	1	5
(England) Tottenham Hotspur	0	0	0
(Spain) Barcelona	5	1	6
(Ukraine) Shakhtar Donetsk	1	0	1
(Italy) Internazionale	2	1	3
(Germany) Schalke 04	5	2	7
(England) Chelsea	0	1	1
(England) Manchester United	1	2	3

Semi-finals
(Spain) Real Madrid	0	1	1
(Spain) Barcelona	2	1	3
(Germany) Schalke 04	0	1	1
(England) Manchester United	2	4	6

Final
28 May – London
(Spain) Barcelona	3
(England) Manchester United	1

=== Round of 16 ===
The draw for the round of 16 was held on 17 December 2010. The first legs of the round of 16 were played on 15, 16, 22 and 23 February, and the second legs were played on 8, 9, 15 and 16 March 2011.

Team 1	Agg.	Team 2	1st leg	2nd leg
Roma (Italy)	2–6	(Ukraine) Shakhtar Donetsk	2–3	0–3
Milan (Italy)	0–1	(England) Tottenham Hotspur	0–1	0–0
Valencia (Spain)	2–4	(Germany) Schalke 04	1–1	1–3
Internazionale (Italy)	3–3 (a)	(Germany) Bayern Munich	0–1	3–2
Lyon (France)	1–4	(Spain) Real Madrid	1–1	0–3
Arsenal (England)	3–4	(Spain) Barcelona	2–1	1–3
Marseille (France)	1–2	(England) Manchester United	0–0	1–2
Copenhagen (Denmark)	0–2	(England) Chelsea	0–2	0–0

=== Quarter-finals ===
The draw for the quarter-finals was held on 18 March 2011. The first legs were played on 5 and 6 April, and the second legs were played on 12 and 13 April 2011.

Team 1	Agg.	Team 2	1st leg	2nd leg
Real Madrid (Spain)	5–0	(England) Tottenham Hotspur	4–0	1–0
Chelsea (England)	1–3	(England) Manchester United	0–1	1–2
Barcelona (Spain)	6–1	(Ukraine) Shakhtar Donetsk	5–1	1–0
Internazionale (Italy)	3–7	(Germany) Schalke 04	2–5	1–2

=== Semi-finals ===
The draw for the semi-finals was held on 18 March 2011, after the quarter-final draw. The first legs were played on 26 and 27 April, and the second legs were played on 3 and 4 May 2011.

Team 1	Agg.	Team 2	1st leg	2nd leg
Schalke 04 (Germany)	1–6	(England) Manchester United	0–2	1–4
Real Madrid (Spain)	1–3	(Spain) Barcelona	0–2	1–1

=== Final ===
The 2011 UEFA Champions League Final was played on 28 May 2011 at Wembley Stadium in London, England. A draw was held on 18 March 2011, after the quarter-final and semi-final draws, to determine the "home" team for administrative purposes.

28 May 2011
19:45 UTC+1

Barcelona (Spain)	3–1	(England) Manchester United
Pedro 27'; Messi 54'; Villa 69'	Report	Rooney 34'

Wembley Stadium, London
Attendance: 87,695
Referee: Viktor Kassai (Hungary)

== Statistics ==
Statistics exclude qualifying rounds and play-off round.

=== Top goalscorers ===
Rank	Player	Team	Goals	Minutes played
1	(Argentina) Lionel Messi	(Spain) Barcelona	12	1,098
2	(Germany) Mario Gómez	(Germany) Bayern Munich	8	634
2	(Cameroon) Samuel Eto'o	(Italy) Internazionale	8	937
4	(France) Nicolas Anelka	(England) Chelsea	7	600
5	(France) Karim Benzema	(Spain) Real Madrid	6	398
5	(Spain) Roberto Soldado	(Spain) Valencia	6	438
5	(Portugal) Cristiano Ronaldo	(Spain) Real Madrid	6	1,067
8	(Spain) Pedro	(Spain) Barcelona	5	812
8	(Spain) Raúl	(Germany) Schalke 04	5	1,130
10	(Croatia) Eduardo	(Ukraine) Shakhtar Donetsk	4	279
10	(Italy) Marco Borriello	(Italy) Roma	4	554
10	(Mexico) Javier Hernández	(England) Manchester United	4	582
10	(England) Peter Crouch	(England) Tottenham Hotspur	4	604
10	(Sweden) Zlatan Ibrahimović	(Italy) Milan	4	689
10	(Wales) Gareth Bale	(England) Tottenham Hotspur	4	770
10	(Brazil) Luiz Adriano	(Ukraine) Shakhtar Donetsk	4	833
10	(England) Wayne Rooney	(England) Manchester United	4	839
10	(Peru) Jefferson Farfán	(Germany) Schalke 04	4	847
10	(Spain) David Villa	(Spain) Barcelona	4	954

=== Squad of the season ===
The UEFA technical study group selected the following 21 players as the squad of the tournament.

Pos.	Player	Team
GK	(Spain) Víctor Valdés	(Spain) Barcelona
GK	(Netherlands) Edwin van der Sar	(England) Manchester United
GK	(Spain) Iker Casillas	(Spain) Real Madrid
DF	(Brazil) Dani Alves	(Spain) Barcelona
DF	(Spain) Gerard Piqué	(Spain) Barcelona
DF	(Spain) Carles Puyol	(Spain) Barcelona
DF	(England) John Terry	(England) Chelsea
DF	(Serbia) Nemanja Vidić	(England) Manchester United
DF	(Brazil) Marcelo	(Spain) Real Madrid
MF	(England) Jack Wilshere	(England) Arsenal
MF	(Spain) Andrés Iniesta	(Spain) Barcelona
MF	(Spain) Xavi	(Spain) Barcelona
MF	(Wales) Ryan Giggs	(England) Manchester United
MF	(Wales) Gareth Bale	(England) Tottenham Hotspur
MF	(Croatia) Luka Modrić	(England) Tottenham Hotspur
FW	(Argentina) Lionel Messi	(Spain) Barcelona
FW	(Spain) Pedro	(Spain) Barcelona
FW	(Spain) David Villa	(Spain) Barcelona
FW	(Cameroon) Samuel Eto'o	(Italy) Inter Milan
FW	(England) Wayne Rooney	(England) Manchester United
FW	(Portugal) Cristiano Ronaldo	(Spain) Real Madrid

== Prize money ==
Just for being in the group stage, each club received €3.9 million (compared with €3.8 million last season 2009–2010), followed by €550,000 for each group match they played, or €3.3 million for the whole group stage, giving them each a total of €7.2 million in participation bonuses. In addition, each club had the possibility of netting up to €4.8m in group stage performance bonuses (€800,000 for a win; €400,000 for a draw). Real Madrid CF took the most from this pot, with a near-maximum €4.4 million. A place in the round of 16 was worth €3 million, in the quarter-finals €3.3 million and in the semi-finals €4.2 million. The overall winners, FC Barcelona, received an additional €9 million, bringing their total bonuses to €30.7 million (out of a maximum €31.5 million). Manchester United FC, the runners-up, received a final match bonus of €5.6 million. The second payments category, the market pool, depends primarily on the value of the clubs' domestic markets. If an association is represented by more than one club, however, the clubs' shares are calculated, first, on the basis of their position in the previous season's domestic championship and, second, on the basis of the number of matches they play in the competition (group stage onwards). With €27.023m, Chelsea FC received the largest market pool share of all the clubs in the 2010/11 UEFA Champions League. In addition, the clubs all keep their own gate receipts.

== See also ==
- 2009–10 UEFA Champions League
- 2010–11 UEFA Europa League
- 2011 FIFA Club World Cup
- 2011 UEFA Super Cup
- 2010–11 UEFA Women's Champions League
