= 2009 Faroe Islands Cup =

Tournament details
- Country: Faroe Islands
- Teams: 19

Final positions
- Champions: Víkingur
- Runners-up: EB/Streymur

Tournament statistics
- Matches played: 20
- Goals scored: 66 (3.3 per match)
- Top goal scorer: 4 players (3 goals)

The 2009 Faroe Islands Cup started on 28 March 2009 and ended on 29 July 2009. The defending champions were two-time winners EB/Streymur.

Only the first teams of Faroese football clubs are allowed to participate. The Preliminary Round involved only teams from first, second and third deild. Teams from the highest division entered the competition in the First Round.

== Preliminary round ==
These fixtures involve clubs below the Faroe Islands Premier League. These matches took place on 28 and 30 March 2009.

Team 1	Score	Team 2
Royn	1–2	Undri
TB	6–0	NÍF
MB	4–1	Skála

== First round ==
Entering in this round are the winners from the preliminary round and the clubs from this year's Faroe Islands Premier League. These matches were played on 9 April 2009.

Team 1	Score	Team 2
Víkingur	5–0	MB
AB	3–2	B68
FC Hoyvík	4–0	Undri
TB	0–0 (a.e.t.); 8–7 (p)	B36
KÍ	0–3	07 Vestur
B71	0–1	ÍF
HB	2–1	NSÍ
VB/Sumba	0–4	EB/Streymur

== Quarter-finals ==
Entering this round are the eight winners from the first round. These matches are scheduled for 29 April.

Team 1	Score	Team 2
EB/Streymur	1–0	FC Hoyvík
TB	1–1 (a.e.t.); 3–4 (p)	AB
07 Vestur	0–3	ÍF
Víkingur	2–1	HB

== Semi-finals ==
Entering this round are the four winners from the Quarterfinals. These ties are played over two legs, scheduled for 19 and 28 May.

Team 1	Agg.	Team 2	1st leg	2nd leg
AB	2–5	EB/Streymur	1–1	1–4
ÍF	0–6	Víkingur	0–1	0–5

== Final ==
29 July 2009
16:00

Víkingur	3–2	EB/Streymur
Djurhuus 6'; A. Olsen 47'; Justinussen 87'	Report (in Faroese)	P. Hansen 15'; A. Hansen 89'

Gundadalur, Tórshavn
Attendance: 2,900
Referee: Páll Augustinussen

== Top goalscorers ==
Player	Team	Goals
(Faroe Islands) Hans Jørgen Djurhuus	Víkingur	3
(Faroe Islands) Arnbjørn Hansen	EB/Streymur	3
(Faroe Islands) Finnur Justinussen	Víkingur	3
(Faroe Islands) Andreas Olsen	Víkingur	3
