= The UEFA Plaque =

European football honorific award

- Digital reproduction of The UEFA Plaque presented to Juventus in 1988
- Sport: Professional men's association football
- League: Football associations affilied to UEFA
- Competition: UEFA club competitions
- Discipline: senior association football
- Awarded for: Clubs' outstanding sporting merits in international competitions
- Local name: UEFA-Abzeichen (German), Plaque UEFA (French)
- Nickname: UEFA set award European set award
- Country: Switzerland
- Presented by: Union of European Football Associations (though its president)

History
- First award: 1988; 38 years ago
- First winner: (Italy) Juventus
- Most recent: (England) Chelsea (2025; 1 year ago)

The UEFA Plaque is an honorific award given by the Union of European Football Associations (UEFA) to clubs that had won, at least once, the title in each of the three major international competitions organised by the confederation, namely the European Champions Cup, the Cup Winners' Cup and the UEFA Cup. It was officially established in late 1987 being regarded "an accomplishment of clubs' excellence and consistency in the confederation competitions".

UEFA awarded the prize for first time in the second half of 1988, prior of the 1988–89 European tournaments draw, with Italian Juventus being the club to be honoured. A second award was initially scheduled for the second half of 1992 in favour of Dutch side Ajax, but it was not conferred for unclarified reasons by the confederation after Spanish team Barcelona—who did not comply with the requirement imposed by UEFA as they had won the Inter-Cities Fairs Cup as opposed to the UEFA Cup—; at the same time unsuccessfully applied to European football's governing body for such recognition, while then UEFA chairman Lennart Johansson proposed strongly to unify the three seasonal competitions into a unique élite pan-continental championship with the best clubs of the continent, a kind of Super League ante litteram.

A similar award was made in 2025 after English team Chelsea won its first UEFA Conference League–instituted four seasons earlier—and added this feat to the three major confederation competitions they had already won between 1971 and 2013.

== Background ==
Between 1971 and 1999, UEFA organised three major competitions—the European Cup, Cup Winners' Cup and UEFA Cup—which were played as part of the international fixture calendar. (Note: From 1955 to 1971 each seasonal competition was regulated by its own committee. From 1972 onwards a single committee assumed responsibility for the three competitions. The Intercontinental Cup and the UEFA Super Cup not have a defined date in the international calendar until 1980 and 1998, respectively, and so in some cases these didn't carried out.) While all three carried prestige in their own right, the European Cup, which was the competition for clubs that had won their own domestic league title, was considered the most prestigious, while the UEFA Cup, in which the four teams that finished just below the national league champion were generally entered, was regarded as the hardest to win.

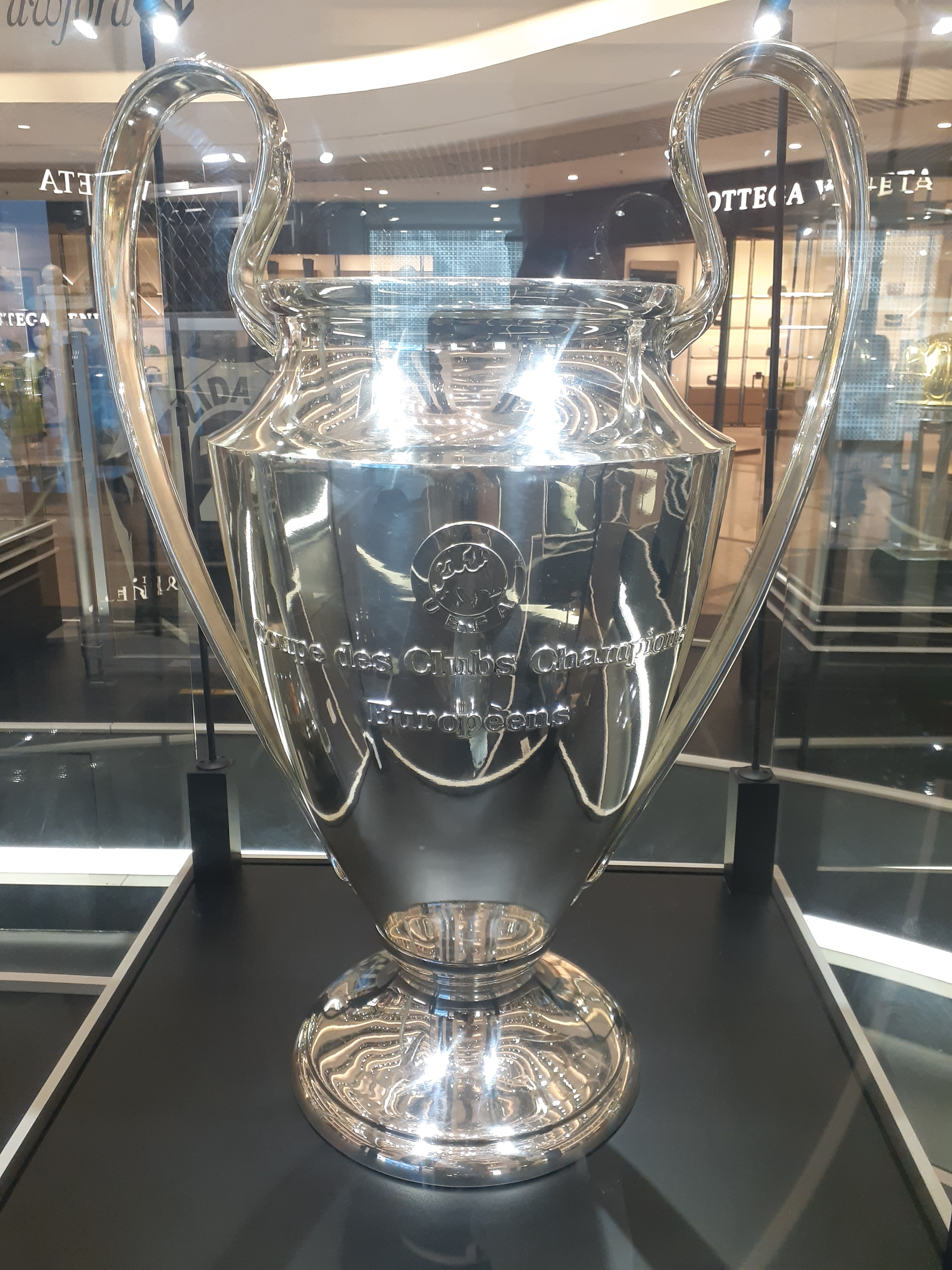
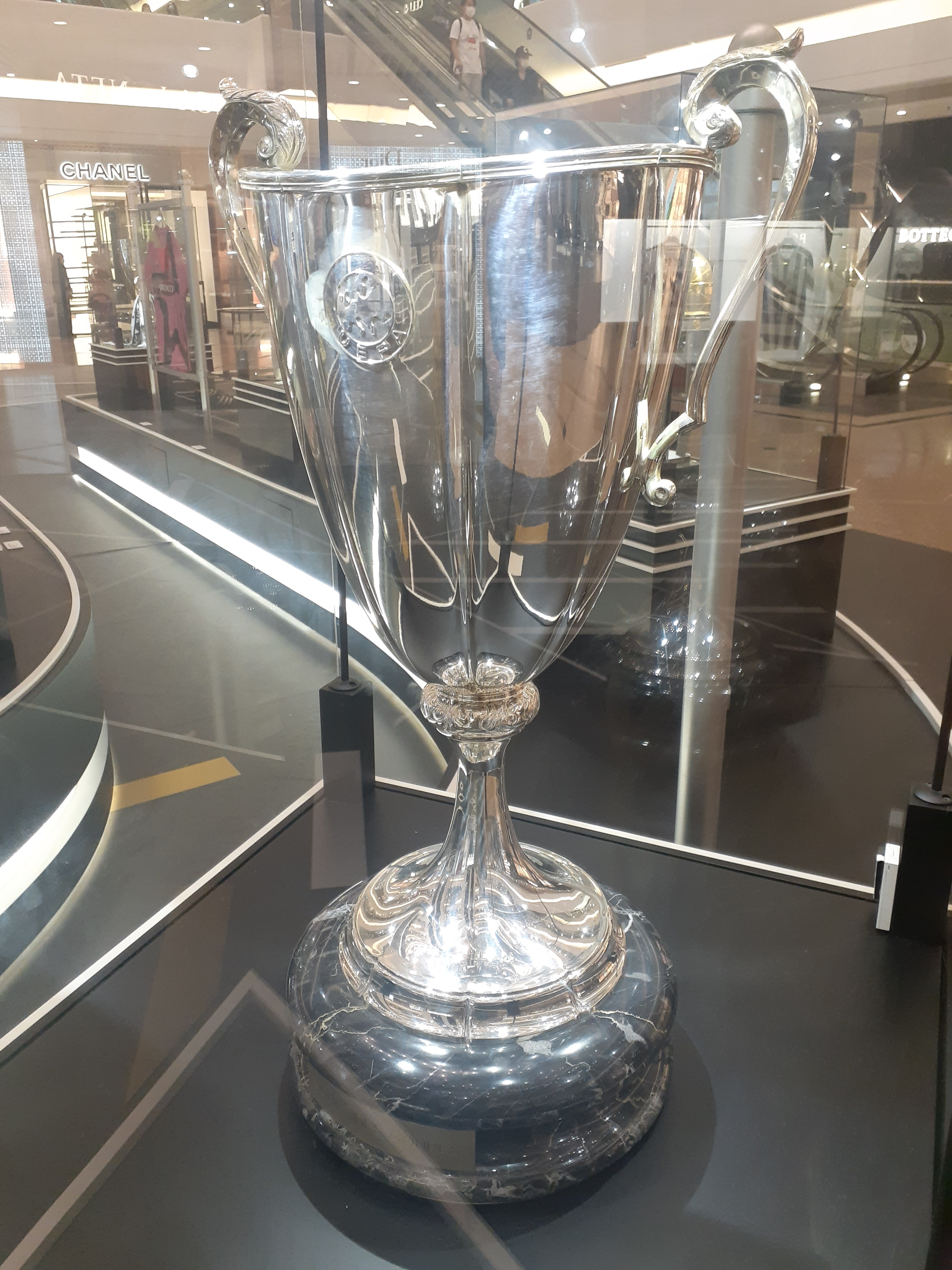
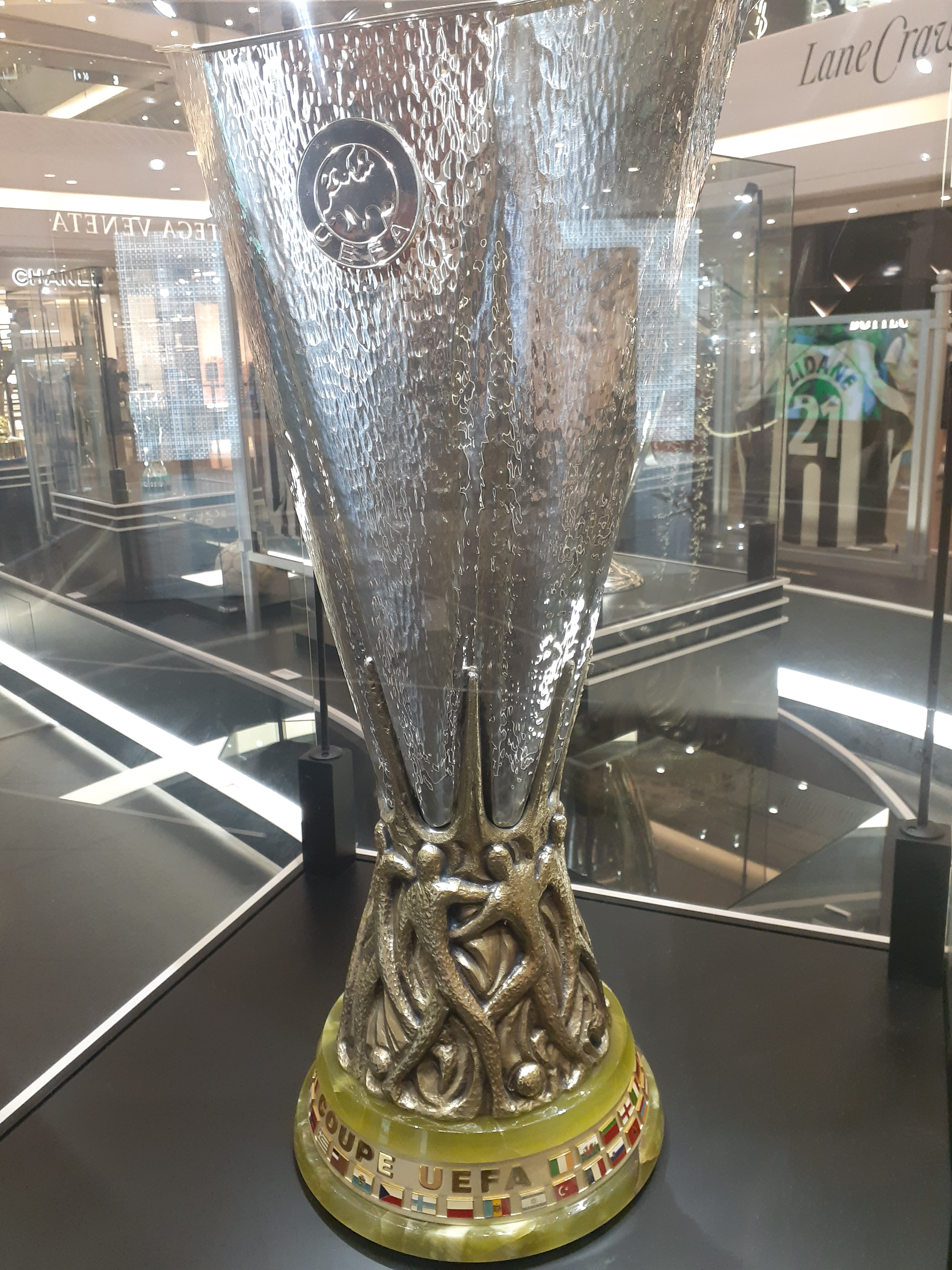
The European Champions' Cup (left), the Cup Winners' Cup (middle), and the UEFA Cup (right) trophies, assembling the original European Treble (2021).

At the start of the 1984–85 season, Juventus and Hamburger SV had won two of the three European competitions each, and each was competing that season in the competition that they needed to win to complete the set; Juventus in the European Cup and Hamburg in the UEFA Cup. Hamburg were eliminated in the third round of the UEFA Cup, while Juventus reached the 1985 European Cup final, winning the game 1–0 to become the first club in history to have won all three of UEFA's major competitions.

In December 1987, the UEFA organising committee proposed in Zürich the institution of a special award for clubs that had won all three competitions. Having been ratified, it was announced it would be awarded for the first time to all eligible clubs at the UEFA meeting planned for May 1988. While Anderlecht in European Cup and Milan in the UEFA Cup during the 1987–88 season were potentially in a position to match Juventus' achievement, being both eliminated in the quarter-finals and in the second round, respectively; when the new UEFA Plaque was finally conferred in July 1988, it was to Juventus alone that it was awarded. In a similar situation were both Ajax and Bayern Munich, which failed to win the 1988–89 UEFA Cup.

== Description ==
The award consists of a rectangular silver plaque on which are superimposed silhouettes of three trophies that represent the tournaments mentioned, above a golden laurel wreath and the European football government body badge, also in gold. Also, the plaque have the following inscription in French, then the confederation's leading administrative language, (Note: At the time, UEFA's administrative languages were French, English and German, being the first cited the most widely used.) which translated to English:

Hommage
L'UEFA au Juventus F.C.
Premier club ayant remporté les trois competitions inter-clubs de l'UEFA
Coupe des Clubs Champions Européenns
Coupe des Vainqueurs de Coupe Européenne
Coupe UEFA.

Translation:

Tribute
The UEFA to Juventus F.C.
First club to have won the three international UEFA club competitions
European Champion Clubs' Cup
European Cup Winners' Cup
UEFA Cup.

Before the premiation to Juventus from UEFA, the Old Lady additionally won the 1984 European Super Cup and the 1985 Intercontinental Cup, obtaining its first worldwide title and became the first club in the world to have triumph in then all-five international competitions. (Note: Since 1992 to 1995, that record was reached by Dutch Ajax. In 1999, Juventus revalided its own record after win the UEFA Intertoto Cup, becaming also the first team in Europe to having won six different confederation competitions.)

== Recipients ==
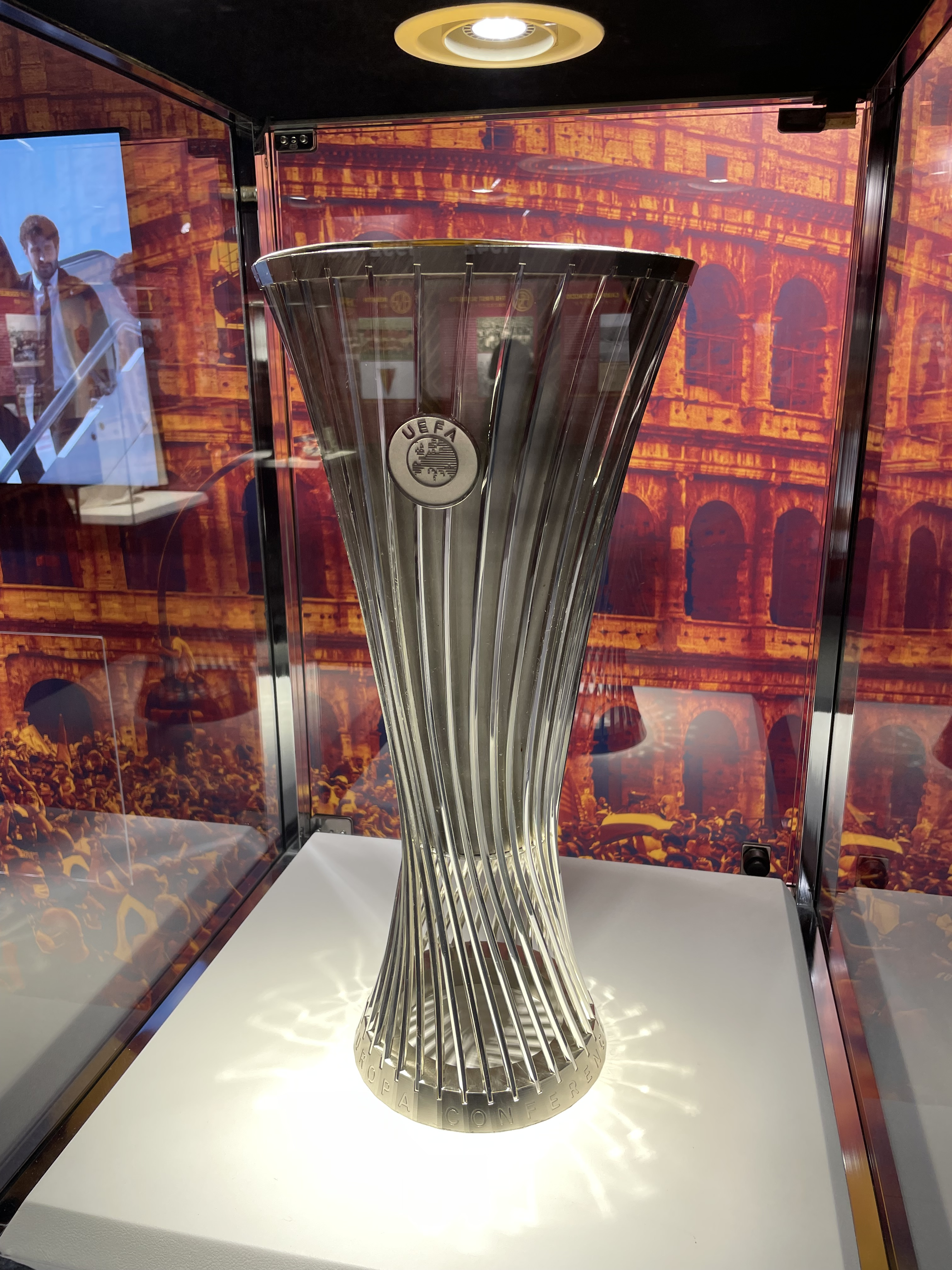
The UEFA (Europa) Conference League trophy in 2022.

On 12 July 1988, at the beginning of the 1988–89 European competitions seeding held in Geneva (Switzerland), then UEFA president Jacques Georges presented the prize to then Juventus president Giampiero Boniperti.

In July 1992, after winning the European Champions' Cup, then-FC Barcelona president Josep Lluís Núñez requested to UEFA a similar recognition, stating that his club had equalled Juventus' record, having won formerly the Cup Winners' Cup and the UEFA Cup. The European football's governing body, now led by Lennart Johansson, rejected it because the Spanish club had never won the UEFA Cup proper, and UEFA did not recognize its predecessor, the Inter-Cities Fairs Cup, previously won by the Blaugrana three times, as an official competition. Eight months later, Johansson proposed, unsuccessfully, to merge all three seasonal competitions in a unique elite pan-European championship which the better teams in the continent would be involved.

Since UEFA awarded Juventus with the Plaque, four other clubs have won the three seasonal confederation competitions: Ajax (1992, to whom the recognition was initially scheduled after their triumph in 1991–92 UEFA Cup through the away goals rule, notwithstanding the confederation latter decision not to award them for unknown reasons), Bayern Munich (1996), Chelsea (2013), and Manchester United (2017).

On 28 August 2025, at Nyon, the prize was relaunched and Chelsea received a similar recognition Juventus earned 37 years prior, after winning the 2024–25 UEFA Conference League—a competition often regarded by the specialist press as the third-tier of the newfangled European club pyramidal system instituted in 2021 by UEFA president Aleksander Čeferin's initiative: to separate the Europa League's lower teams from the higher in front of a new tournament and that include the relegation of some eliminated clubs to the immediate lower tournament and the promotion of the winning team to the immediate higher tier the successive season—qualifying after finishing sixth in 2023–24 Premier League; completing this achievement with the previous club's set of international seasonal trophies. Čeferin presented the award to then-Chelsea CEO Jason Gannon prior the 2025–26 UEFA seasonal tournaments draw.

As of February 2026, there are 27 former Cup Winners' Cup winners who can achieve this feat; among them, 11 clubs only need to win either the Champions League and the Europa League to complete the UEFA set.

== See also ==
- List of UEFA club competition winners
- UEFA club competition records and statistics

== Bibliography ==
- Vieli, André (2014). UEFA: 60 years at the heart of football (PDF). Nyon: Union des Associations Européennes de Football. doi:10.22005/bcu.175315. Archived (PDF) from the original on 3 August 2021.
