= College football super league =

Since the 1950s, there has been discussion about the potential for the creation of a college football super league (also called a National College Football Conference) with college football teams from around the country, regardless of conference. The formation of such a conference could require participating schools to leave the NCAA Division I Football Bowl Subdivision, and the conference would be an unsanctioned competition.

== History ==
=== Tom Hamilton ===
In 1950's then Pittsburgh halfback Tom Hamilton proposed that USC, UCLA, Stanford, California, and Washington should form part of a conference with Army, Navy, Notre Dame, Pittsburgh, Syracuse, Penn State, and Air Force, creating an "Airplane Conference." Discussions for the Conference did not get off the ground.

=== 2021 ===
In 2021 after the announcement of The European Super League there was increased discussion of the potential of a College Football Super League. ESPN said that a conference could generate more income, especially from TV revenue, as all of the best teams would feature in the league. Sporting News listed Alabama, Ohio State, LSU, Clemson, Georgia, Oklahoma, Notre Dame, Texas, Florida, Michigan, Florida State, Auburn, Miami, Penn State, and USC as the teams that would make the cut for the mooted15-team College Football Super League. It would be based on four criteria: revenue, championships, overall team record, and the history of team players being drafted into the NFL.

The Associated Press claimed that the chances of a College Football Super Conference being formed was slim but suggested a restructuring of Division I and a change to how schools align their sports programs was probably a good idea. Chris Bevilacqua, CEO of SimpleBet, said that he did not think a College Football Super League would be possible.

A rough Nelson's estimate found that a 32-team college football super league could generate two and a half times more television revenue for bigger schools in the SEC and the Big Ten then they receive now, with the figure rising to five times more for Pac-12 and ACC schools.

The Atlanta Journal-Constitution wrote that a College Football Super League could get a better reception then The Super League in Association football because college football does not have the expectation of sporting parity and games between bigger teams get larger audiences then those between small teams and larger teams. The article noted that a College Football Super League would not require the approval of players because they are denied labor rights. Thus, the NCAA would not have leverage to prevent athletes from joining the Super League.

== Criticism ==
Griffin McVeigh said in Longhorn Wire that a College Football Super League would devalue non-conference games and would throw away "traditions, pageantry, and decades of history" in the pursuit of greed. In addition, smaller schools left out of such a Super League would have diminished TV deals, exposure, and recruiting prospects. Dan Woken in USA Today wrote that a Super League "would destroy the fabric of what college football" and could face "severe backlash" if it was created.

== See also ==
- The Super League
- Proposals for a European Super League in association football
