= European Premier League =

European Premier League may refer to:

- European T20 Premier League
- Proposals for a European Super League in association football
