= Vinai Venkatesham =

British-Indian football administrator

Vinai Venkatesham OBE
- Born: United Kingdom
- Occupation: Football administrator
- Known for: Football administration

Vinaichandra Guduguntla Venkatesham OBE (/ˌvɪŋkəˈteɪʃəm/ VINK-ə-TAY-shəm) is a British football administrator. He is the Chief Executive of Tottenham Hotspur.

== Life and career ==
A former employee of Arsenal in a variety of roles, he was appointed Managing Director to replace the outgoing Ivan Gazidis. Immediately before the promotion, he was the chief commercial officer.

He worked at the London 2012 Olympic and Paralympic Games prior to joining Arsenal and then onwards to his current role as CEO of Tottenham Hotspur, and also currently a non-executive director of the British Olympic Association. He serves on the Board and Executive Committee of the European Club Association and on the Board of the Joint Venture (UCCSA) between UEFA and the European Club Association. He has previously been a non-executive director of the 2017 World Athletics Championships in London. In September 2023, it was announced that he would step down from his position as Arsenal's CEO in summer 2024.

He was appointed Officer of the Order of the British Empire (OBE) in the 2024 New Year Honours for services to sport.

On 11 April 2025, Tottenham Hotspur announced that Venkatesham would be joining their board of directors as Chief Executive Officer that summer.
