= G-14 =

Defunct organisation of European football clubs

- Successor: ECA
- Formation: 1998–2008
- Type: Sports organization

The G-14 was an organisation of European football clubs which existed between 1998 and 2008. It consisted of 14 European top class teams initially, later expanded to 18. It was disbanded in 2008 and was replaced by the European Club Association representing over 100 clubs, in a deal reached with UEFA and FIFA.

== Composition ==
The G-14 clubs were spread across seven countries, and had won around 250 national league titles. Three came from the top division of Italy; two from each of Spain, France, Germany, the Netherlands, and England; and one came from Portugal. G-14 members had won the European Cup/Champions League 41 times out of 51 seasons.

The 2004 Champions League final was the first in that competition since 1992 in which one of the finalists was not a G-14 member; the 2004 final featured member FC Porto and non-member AS Monaco, with Porto winning the final. There have been only four Champions League or European Cup finals where both teams were non-members of G-14 (1970, 1979, 1980, 2021).

== History ==
The G-14 was founded on 14 October in 1998 by 14 leading clubs to provide a unified voice in negotiations with UEFA and FIFA. New members could join by invitation only.

Italian company Media Partners had planned a European breakaway league for the G-14 teams, forcing UEFA to expand the Champions League from 16 to 32 clubs for the 1999–2000 season.

In August 2002, four more clubs joined, taking the membership to 18, although the organisation retained its original name.

The idea of a breakaway league similar to the basketball ULEB Euroleague re-emerged in December 2003 when a group of Spanish businessmen, headed by entrepreneur Carlos Garcia Pardo, said that they were aiming to establish a 16-team competition called the "European Golden Cup" as a rival to UEFA Champions League.

During that time the G-14 group were reportedly unhappy that UEFA has opted to cut the second phase of the Champions League from the 2003–04 season: a move that reduced each club's number of potential European matches by four. As a result, G-14 were reported to be considering for a European superleague to begin in the season 2006–07, when the latest television deal for the Champions League would end.

As the leading clubs in European Football, their power on the world stage was best demonstrated during the 2006 FIFA World Cup, where they provided 22% of participating players. This supported their assertion that national associations should pay players' wages whilst on international duty and provide compensation in the case of injuries. In April 2004, G-14 initiated a preliminary investigation into FIFA by the Swiss Competition Commission, when they complained of FIFA's requiring their players to be available for FIFA international competitions without compensating the clubs. FIFA president Sepp Blatter refused to negotiate with the G-14 on the matter.

On 5 September 2005, the G-14 clubs decided to take FIFA to court over paying players for internationals after the Belgian club Charleroi lost Abdelmajid Oulmers in November for eight months when he was injured playing for Morocco.

Prior to the 2006 World Cup, the G-14 members demanded a "fair percentage" of receipts from tournaments, such as the World Cup, to compensate for the clubs releasing players to compete in these tournaments.

On 11 January 2007, Fenerbahçe were officially invited to G-14.

The last president of the group was Olympique Lyonnais chairman Jean-Michel Aulas, who replaced David Dein, who stepped down after six months of a two-year presidency after leaving Arsenal. Aulas was elected president on 16 May 2007, after securing unanimous agreement from member clubs to the principle of expanding the G-14's membership. Aulas announced his intention to consider inviting a further 16 teams to join, stating that he wanted the G14 "to expand geographically and be strengthened by other clubs". In October 2007, 22 additional European clubs were invited to participate in talks towards expansion.

On 28 May 2007, at an extraordinary meeting of the UEFA Congress in Zürich, UEFA President Michel Platini called upon G-14 to disband, declaring that they were "elitist" and that club grievances could be aired through a new UEFA body, the Professional Football Strategy Council.

On 15 January 2008, the G-14 and UEFA came to an agreement. FIFA and UEFA would pay compensation for international injuries and selection after a World Cup or European Championship and, in return, the G-14 agreed to disband on 15 February 2008. However a new European Club Association, created in that year by a merge between the G-14 and the European Club Forum, a task force created by the confederation in 2002 and composed by 103 clubs from then 53 nations affiliated to UEFA (at least one team from each country), including all G-14 clubs, was set up in its place.

== Members ==
Founding members, 1998

- Real Madrid (Spain)
- Barcelona (Spain)
- Manchester United (England)
- Liverpool (England)
- Internazionale (Italy)
- Juventus (Italy)
- Milan (Italy)
- Marseille (France)
- Paris Saint-Germain (France)
- Bayern Munich (Germany)
- Borussia Dortmund (Germany)
- Ajax (Netherlands)
- PSV Eindhoven (Netherlands)
- Porto (Portugal)

New members, 2002

- Arsenal (England)
- Bayer Leverkusen (Germany)
- Lyon (France)
- Valencia (Spain)

== See also ==
- Proposals for a European Super League in association football – A project for a sole pan-European Football League in which G-14 has been involved

== Sources ==
- G-14 considering Super league (2003)
