= European Super League =

Proposed annual football club competition

Unify League
- Organiser(s): A22 Sports Management S.L.
- Founded: 18 April 2021 (proposal)
- Region: Europe
- Broadcaster: Unify Platform
- Motto: "One For All"
- Website: a22sports.com

The Unify League (UL), previously known as the European Super League (ESL), was a proposed seasonal football competition for clubs in Europe. It was supposed to be organised by the European Super League Company SL, a commercial enterprise created to rival or replace the UEFA Champions League. The initial iteration of the league entailed 20 teams, with 15 of them being founding members of the competition. Almost all teams had withdrawn immediately in April 2021 owing to public backlash; by 2025, following Barcelona's withdrawal, only Real Madrid had remained in the proposed competition format, withdrawing in February 2026.

The leadership behind the UL was Florentino Pérez (president of Real Madrid). The other founders, Andrea Agnelli (chairman of Juventus), Joel Glazer (co-owner of Manchester United), John W. Henry (owner of Liverpool) and Stan Kroenke (owner of Arsenal), withdrew shortly thereafter in the face of rejection by their clubs. By 2023, Pérez and Joan Laporta (president of Barcelona) remained the strongest advocates of the UL.

The European Super League announcement in April 2021 was met with significant opposition from various groups: fans, players, managers and football clubs. The league also faced opposition from UEFA, FIFA and some national governments. Critics of the league raised concerns regarding potential exclusivity and reduced competitiveness within the ESL, as the league would consist of high-ranking teams from selected European countries who would be permanent contestants in a semi-closed league format.

The backlash against the announcement of the league's plans resulted in nine of the clubs that were supposed to participate, including all six English clubs, announcing their intention to withdraw. However, eight clubs maintain a degree of involvement in the project as stakeholders. In April 2021, the ESL announced that it was suspending its operations, and a legal dispute followed. National courts have ruled that FIFA and UEFA must not interfere with the development of the ESL.

In October 2022, A22 Sports Management, a company formed to "sponsor and assist" in the creation of the European Super League, announced it would be exploring plans to relaunch the competition. On 21 December 2023, the European Court of Justice issued a ruling that a ban on the ESL could be in conflict with certain European Union regulations.

== Background ==
=== Concept ===
Map of the twelve founding clubs

In 1968, then UEFA general secretary Hans Bangerter proposed the creation of a new "super-league" competition for European clubs that would replace the European Champions Cup and the Cup Winners' Cup and form the "European Football League Championship", a unique club-competition combining group and knockout matches, a novelty at the time. The proposal was never seriously entertained and, in the same year, UEFA agreed to expand clubs' access to its competitions by creating a third seasonal tournament, the UEFA Cup, whose inaugural season took place three years later. The idea for a unique pan-European club competition was again discussed in the 1970s and gained legal traction at the end of the following decade.

In 1987, Milan, Real Madrid and Rangers executives planned a league competition with a single round-robin format – dubbed a "Super League" by European mass media since the proposed format of the tournament was the same as that used in league championships, contrasted with the format of the European competitions, based on knockout phases since the mid-1950s – that would be more attractive for international television broadcasters, and would ostensibly allow the participating clubs to earn more income for "economic and management guarantees". The competition was supposed to run parallel to the then three European competitions from the 1991–92 season onwards, but the project was abandoned in 1991 after UEFA announced sporting sanctions sine die for the clubs involved. UEFA also reformed the European Champions Cup introducing a group stage for the 1991–92 season, increasing the overall number of games, and rebranding the competition as the Champions League since 1992. The following year, then UEFA president Lennart Johansson proposed, unsuccessfully, to merge the Champions League, the Cup Winners' Cup and the UEFA Cup into a unique championship.

Three years later, Ajax, Barcelona, Bayern Munich and Manchester United secretly planned a "Super League", to rival the Champions League. It would have 36 "prominent" clubs split into three groups and a play-off stage for the title at the end of the season. There would also be a second competition for a further 96 teams, called "ProCup", which would replace the UEFA's Cup Winners' Cup and the UEFA Cup. The planned tournaments, based on the North American sports system, would have been sponsored by Italian corporation Media Partners. The project was abandoned after UEFA and its affiliated national associations and FIFA announced sanctions against all involved clubs. In 1998, the concept was still being promoted by Media Partners but it never progressed past the planning stage after UEFA moved to expand the UEFA Champions League. Various other proposals were brought forward but all equally failed to achieve popular approval.

In 2009, Florentino Pérez, president of Real Madrid, began planning for a "super-league competition," stating that the Champions League was too "obsolete and problematic" for the quality of the sport, and was "an obstacle preventing clubs from growing their businesses and developing infrastructure".

In 2018, Pérez began discussions with other clubs in Europe, mostly clubs from Spain, England and Italy, about the idea of a "breakaway" competition meant to provide "strong financial backing" for all the clubs involved. The clubs who participated in the discussions, conducted in secret, were primarily focused on exploring options if UEFA would not produce "reforms" for the Champions League that would be considered as acceptable for them. The idea of a new competition again surfaced in 2020, as big-name football clubs suffered financially from the COVID-19 pandemic lockdowns, especially with ongoing debts. Real Madrid was amongst those hardest hit financially by the pandemic in Spain, which led to Pérez advancing the concept once again. The announcement of a new competition eventually drew interest from American investment firm JPMorgan Chase, which pledged US$5 billion towards its formation.

On 18 April 2021, the eve of a UEFA Executive Committee meeting whose objective was to revamp and expand the UEFA Champions League by the 2024–25 season in order to increase the number of matches and revenues. Pérez announced the "formation of the Super League," also referred to as the "European Super League" or ESL, via a press release by the twelve clubs that had signed up to be involved. These included English clubs (Arsenal, Chelsea, Liverpool, Manchester City, Manchester United, and Tottenham Hotspur), Italian clubs (Inter Milan, Juventus, and Milan), and Spanish clubs (Atlético Madrid, Barcelona, and Real Madrid).

Pérez expressed the "hope" that the new competition would "provide higher-quality matches and additional financial resources for the overall football pyramid", provide "significantly greater economic growth and support for European football via a long-term commitment to uncapped solidarity payments, which will grow in line with league revenues", would appeal to a new younger generation of football fans, and also would improve VAR and refereeing. At the time of the announcement, ten of the founding clubs were in the top 14 of the UEFA club coefficient rankings, with only Inter (26th) and Milan (53rd) falling outside. All twelve clubs were in the top 16 on the 2021 Forbes' list of the most valuable football clubs; their combined value was US$34.4 billion.

=== Leadership ===
The launch of the ESL included the announcement of the organisation's executive leadership. The table below shows each football executive who became involved in the competition's operations, and the role they'd held within the sport:

Position	Name	Nationality	Other positions
Chairman	Florentino Pérez	Spain	President of Real Madrid
Vice-chairman	Andrea Agnelli	Italy	Chairman of Juventus
Vice-chairman	Joel Glazer	United States	Co-chairman of Manchester United
Vice-chairman	John W. Henry	United States	Owner of Liverpool
Vice-chairman	Stan Kroenke	United States	Owner of Arsenal

According to reports, Gavin Patterson, former BT Sport boss, was approached to take up the role of chief executive officer.

=== Format ===
Following the format for the initial stages of the European basketball's EuroLeague, the proposed competition would feature 20 clubs that would take part in matches against each other. 15 of these clubs would be "permanent members", and were dubbed "founding clubs". The founding clubs would govern the competition's operation, while five places would be given to clubs through a qualifying mechanism focused on the teams who performed best in their country's most recent domestic-league season.

Each year, the competition would see the teams split into two groups of ten clubs, playing home-and-away games in a double round-robin format for 18 group games per team, with fixtures set to take place midweek to avoid disrupting the clubs' involvement in their domestic leagues. At the end of these group matches, the top three of each group would qualify for the quarter-finals, while the teams finishing fourth and fifth from each group would compete in two-legged play-offs to decide the last two quarter-finalists. The remainder of the competition would take place in a four-week span at the end of the season, with the quarter-finals and semi-finals featuring two-legged ties, while the final would be contested as a single fixture at a neutral venue. Each season of the competition would feature 197 games: 180 in the group stage and 17 in the knockout stage.

On 15 October 2021, it was announced that the European Super League Company, led by Real Madrid, Barcelona and Juventus, was planning an open league with two divisions of 20 clubs each, intended to compete with the Champions League and Europa League.

=== Contracts ===
The proposed European Super League (ESL) intended to offer participating clubs uncapped 'solidarity payments', which would increase alongside the league's revenues and surpass the payouts of existing European competitions. According to the league's press release, these payments would amount to "in excess of €10 billion during the course of the initial commitment period of the clubs". Additionally, the founding clubs would collectively receive €3.5 billion to support infrastructure investments and offset the impacts of the COVID-19 pandemic.

The proposed payment structure for the ESL included sharing 32.5 percent of commercial revenues among the founding clubs and all 20 ESL teams (including five invited teams), with an additional 20 percent distributed based on club performance. The remaining 15 percent would be allocated according to each club's broadcast audience size. In addition, clubs would be permitted to retain gate receipts and club sponsorship revenue.

The ESL claimed that the league would generate income across football and increase revenues, enabling larger clubs to invest more in smaller clubs through transfer fees. The ESL also offered an annual solidarity payment of €400 million to incentivize participation. The proposal also included a purported solution to the financial control issues raised by UEFA's Financial Fair Play Regulations, although critics disputed the effectiveness of this proposal.

On 23 April 2021, Der Spiegel, having purportedly gained access to the 167-page European Super League contract, revealed that Barcelona and Real Madrid were set to receive €60 million over and above what other clubs would receive over the first two years, whereas A.C. Milan, Inter Milan, Borussia Dortmund and Atlético Madrid were set to make less than other Super League clubs. The Guardian reported the same month that European Super League clubs were promised €200–300 million as a "welcome bonus". It was also reported by Marca that there was a €300 million penalty for leaving the project; the Super League stated that the quoted sum was false. Vozpópuli reported that the "clause is related to the €3.2 billion loan that JP Morgan received" to "ensure the project's viability".

On 20 May, The New York Times reviewed the founding contract of the Super League and found that, while FIFA had publicly criticised a breakaway European Super League, it had held private talks for months with the founders about endorsing the competition. The NYT article reported a need for the ESL founders to strike an agreement with "an entity obliquely labeled W01 but easily identifiable as FIFA", while the document said the agreement was "an essential condition for the implementation of the SL project". It also reported that the Super League offered up to 12 clubs to participate in the new FIFA Club World Cup, and considered allowing FIFA to keep $1 billion in potential payouts as a "solidarity payment".

On 31 May 2021, El Confidencial revealed it had obtained access to the binding contract signed by the twelve clubs on 17 April. According to the contract, the founding clubs would have had the same number of shares in the limited liability company based in Spain, with the contract reading: "The Founding Clubs have agreed to jointly own and hold equal stakes in 'European League Company, S.L.' ('SLCo'), a limited liability company which shall own, manage and operate the SL directly and through a number of subsidiaries (i.e., the SL Companies as this term is defined in Clause 4.3. below)." According to the report, no shares had been sold, meaning that the other nine clubs, despite having publicly backed down from the project, were still involved and waiting for the case to be taken by the Court of Justice of the European Union (CJEU), which had been described as possibly the biggest football ruling since the Bosman case. Furthermore, only Inter officially abandoned the project for sponsorship purposes, having sold all its shares. It also reiterated that there is a penalty of approximately €300 million for breaking the binding contract. The contract already confirmed the Super League's clubs' commitment to both domestic championships and league cups, and that the Super League, described as a "pan-European competition", would start as soon as recognised by UEFA and FIFA, with legal protection from European courts to allow their continued participation in domestic leagues and cups.

On 20 June 2021, The Times reported that the six English clubs, which remained co-owners and shareholders of the Spanish holding company, had failed to formally leave it, and that the project's organisers had stated the competition would "eventually relaunch in modified form". About the binding contract, it was reported, according to those close to the venture, that there is "no mechanism" for the clubs to withdraw, as only unanimous consensus among the twelve founding clubs can dissolve the venture, and any club leaving unilaterally faced "unlimited fines".

== Reception ==
=== Football governing bodies ===
The formation of the ESL led to widespread condemnation from UEFA, The Football Association and Premier League of England, the Italian Football Federation and Lega Serie A of Italy, and the Royal Spanish Football Federation and Liga Nacional de Fútbol Profesional of Spain. All governing bodies issued a joint statement declaring their intention to prevent the new competition from proceeding any further, with UEFA warning that any clubs involved in the Super League would be banned from all other domestic, European and world football competitions, and that players from the clubs involved would also be banned from representing their national teams in international matches. In addition, the French Football Federation and Ligue de Football Professionnel of France, the German Football Association and Deutsche Fußball Liga of Germany, as well as the Russian Premier League and Russian Football Union released similar statements opposing the proposal.

UEFA began immediately looking into making further reforms to the Champions League in a €6 billion effort to prevent the proposal from moving forward. The Premier League and the Football Association released a statement "unanimously and vigorously" opposing the breakaway league but ruled out barring the six breakaway clubs from domestic competitions and preferred not to take legal action against them.

The European Club Association (ECA) held an emergency meeting and subsequently announced its opposition to the plan. Andrea Agnelli, also a member of the UEFA Executive Committee, along with the founding clubs of the Super League, did not attend the virtual meeting. Agnelli later resigned from his positions as ECA chairman and UEFA Executive Committee member, with all twelve Super League clubs also leaving the ECA. On 7 May 2021, UEFA approved reintegration measures for nine clubs involved in that breakaway competition. FIFA later expressed its disapproval in the wake of the negative outcry to the ESL proposal, alongside International Olympic Committee president Thomas Bach, with FIFA president Gianni Infantino stating during an address at the 2021 UEFA Congress in Montreux, Switzerland, both in response to the proposal and the clubs' efforts to remain in their domestic leagues: "If some elect to go their own way then they must live with the consequences of their choice, they are responsible for their choice. Concretely this means, either you are in, or you are out. You cannot be half in and half out. This has to be absolutely clear."

=== Uninvolved clubs ===
Bayern Munich, Borussia Dortmund, and Paris Saint-Germain were sought out by the ESL to join; Bayern and Borussia were given 30 days, and PSG 14 days, to sign up to the Super League, but all three rejected involvement in the competition, publicly condemning the concept. Pérez alleged that the three clubs had not been invited. Other French, German, Portuguese, Italian, and Dutch clubs were reported to have declined to join the competition. West Ham United said on their website that they were strongly opposed to the Super League, emphasising their working-class roots and the 150 academy players who had developed to play for the first team. In a statement, Everton criticised the Big Six English clubs joining the Super League and accused them of "betraying" British football supporters. Leeds United also referred to Liverpool on social media as "Merseyside Reds", referencing the unlicenced name used for the club in the Pro Evolution Soccer video game series. Before a game between the clubs on 19 April, Leeds players warmed up in t-shirts condemning the competition, featuring the UEFA Champions League logo alongside the caption 'earn it' on the front, and 'football is for the fans' on the back. The shirts had been left on the benches inside the Liverpool changing room, but the players did not wear them. Atalanta, Cagliari and Hellas Verona reportedly called for the European Super League teams to be banned from Serie A; Hellas Verona denied in a statement having requested such a ban alongside Atalanta and Cagliari.

On 3 May, a report from Italian financial newspaper Il Sole 24 Ore noted that the Super League project was officially presented by the Lega Serie A Head of Competition and Operation Andrea Butti, as an alternative to the reform of the Champions League planned by UEFA and initially provided for the 2023–24 season, to FIGC and all the 20 participating clubs in the league championship during the meeting organised on 16 February. The publication, which pointed out that similar debates were presented at the same time by Spanish La Liga, English Premier League, and German Bundesliga board members to the clubs in their respective countries, also noted that the Serie A was favourable to the project from an economic point of view and that FIFA was aware of it, to the point that the eventual Super League winner team would participate in the new FIFA Club World Cup, provisionally called the World Club Competition or World League. About the latter, a 20 May New York Times report emphasised FIFA's participation in the European Super League project.

On 22 October, The Athletic reported the results of its anonymous survey of clubs from across UEFA's member associations. According to the survey, 66% of clubs reacted negatively to the Super League's announcement, and 56% said a Super League would negatively affect their club. A slim majority of clubs believed that the Super League concept had not gone away, and many clubs wanted to see a Super League involve more teams from other nations, institute a promotion and relegation system, and a revised distribution of income.

=== Politicians and governments ===
Numerous politicians across Europe expressed opposition to the proposals, the most prominent coming from the British government, with objections to the ESL uniting political parties completely behind preventing it. British Prime Minister Boris Johnson called the proposals "very damaging for football" and vowed to ensure that it "doesn't go ahead in the way that it's currently being proposed", a position which was supported by Leader of the Opposition Keir Starmer. In addition, the Culture Secretary Oliver Dowden said in a statement to the House of Commons that "this move goes against the very spirit of the game", and pledged to do "whatever it takes" to stop English clubs from joining.

French President Emmanuel Macron expressed his support for UEFA's position, stating: "The French state will support all the steps taken by the LFP, FFF, UEFA and FIFA to protect the integrity of federal competitions, whether national or European." The Spanish government released a statement saying they "[do] not support the initiative to create a football Super League promoted by various European clubs, including the Spanish ones." Italian Prime Minister Mario Draghi also backed UEFA in their decision, saying he "strongly supports the positions of the Italian and European football authorities."

=== Individual commentary ===
Despite claims that the ESL would be the "most significant restructuring of elite European football since the creation of the European Cup" and that claims of negative impacts from it were similar to the founding of the Premier League in 1992, commentators had contrasting opinions. Although they noted that the new competition would eliminate financial risk for its founding members by operating on a semi-closed league setup similar to basketball's EuroLeague, which would also eliminate the risk of clubs failing to qualify or being relegated and give these clubs a stable source of revenue and increased value, they also noted it had serious issues.

While Forbes contributor Marc Edelman, professor of law at the City University of New York, wrote that the Super League would bring the lucrative U.S. professional sports league model to Europe. Ian Nicholas Quillen, Major League Soccer and American soccer contributor for Forbes, said the system would be "a sinister hybrid of ['closed' and 'open'] league systems that deflects the drawbacks onto most of its domestic league peers", offering "the Rest of Europe the most meager of prizes imaginable in order to justify not [providing stability or support to all participants] while hoarding the potential gains for themselves." Bloomberg News columnist Alex Webb argued a Premier League weakened by the existence of the Super League could negatively affect Britain's soft power.

Commentators also noted that the ESL could render domestic competitions irrelevant and lower-tier compared to the Super League, and that it would destroy the ideas behind promotion and relegation systems; Pérez later countered this by claiming that the ESL would have a system of promotion and relegation. In an opinion piece by Henry Bushnell of Yahoo Sports, the proposed plan was described as "repulsive", but the idea itself was commended; however, the competition structure would strongly need a system of promotion and relegation based on performance in domestic leagues and the Champions League, and the ESL clubs should share more of its profits with lower status clubs. Writing in Corriere della Sera, Italian sports commentator Mario Sconcerti called the Super League a "crude idea that goes against the fans." Italian journalist Emanuele Celeste spoke of "a regulation not very faithful to traditional football" and the risk of new future rules in reference to the division of a match into three periods instead of two.

Michael Cox argued in The Athletic that the league would help restore completive balance in European football due to the widening gap between big, rich clubs and smaller, poorer clubs in domestic leagues, and this inequality would only increase as time goes on without a Super League.

Commentary from the women's game was largely negative, with several commentators pointing out that the Super League's one-line mention of creating a women's version of the competition seemed like an afterthought, lacking in any details and with many of the Super League clubs not having well-established women's sides. 2018 Ballon d'Or Féminin winner Ada Hegerberg, one of the first high-profile women players to speak out against the league, tweeted that "greed is not the future."

"I would say that's a bad idea. Football has to stay united, it's the most important thing. It's based on sporting merit and overall to respect the history that has been built from European football."

— Former Arsenal manager Arsène Wenger

The reaction of former Manchester United player, current Salford City co-owner, and Sky Sports commentator Gary Neville (who had defended the league vice-chairman Joel Glazer's ownership of Manchester United just over a year previously) generated strong attention on social media, calling the formation "an act of pure greed" and being especially disappointed at his former club's admission, going on to say that stringent measures must be taken against the founding clubs, including bans from European competitions and point deductions. Neville's former United teammate Roy Keane said that it was motivated by money and greed, and praised Bayern Munich for not taking part.

"We don't like it and we don't want it to happen. This is our collective position. Our commitment to this football club and its supporters is absolute and unconditional."

— Collective statement from Liverpool players, following the announcement of the Super League.

Portuguese national team members Bruno Fernandes of Manchester United and João Cancelo of Manchester City became the first footballers to oppose their own clubs joining the league. Liverpool midfielder James Milner said in a post-match interview that he did not like the Super League, and wished it would not happen. Liverpool manager Jürgen Klopp was also critical of the Super League, although he said he would not resign and instead would "sort it somehow" with Fenway Sports Group, who are the owners of the club. Liverpool captain Jordan Henderson called for a meeting for captains of Premier League clubs to discuss a collective response.

Chelsea manager Thomas Tuchel said he trusts his club to make the right decisions in relation to the European Super League. Manchester City manager Pep Guardiola added that while "it is not [really] a sport if success is guaranteed", UEFA "had failed" in advancing the sport and that footballing institutions "think for themselves."

=== Media companies ===
British broadcaster BT Sport, one of the networks that hold the rights to the Champions League and the Premier League, condemned the European Super League and said that it "could have a damaging effect on the long-term health of football in the United Kingdom", whilst its competitor Sky reiterated that it has not held talks to broadcast the league. Amazon Prime Video, which owns streaming rights to the Premier League in the UK, stated they had no involvement. DAZN confirmed they were not "in any way involved or interested in entering into discussions regarding the establishment of a Super League and no conversations have taken place." Facebook also denied involvement in broadcasting discussions.

Mediapro, which holds the rights to La Liga and the Champions League in Spain, told Reuters that "television broadcasters won't break their contracts with UEFA and national leagues to join the breakaway European Super League project"; it also predicted that the Super League would fail.

=== Fan feedback ===
Football Supporters Europe (FSE), a body representing supporters in 45 UEFA countries, issued a statement opposing the creation of the Super League. A snap YouGov poll conducted shortly after the league's announcement found that 79% of British football fans oppose the Super League, with only 14% expressing support; 76% of fans of the British teams joining the Super League also expressed disapproval, with 20% expressing support. International fans of the clubs involved, as well as international football fans who did not support a particular club, were largely supportive of the Super League. Many football fans criticised Tottenham Hotspur's inclusion, as the team had not won a trophy since the 2008 Football League Cup Final. Barcelona fans hung a banner over the Camp Nou which read: "Barcelona is our life, not your toy. No to playing in the Super League."

Supporter groups from all six English clubs opposed the league, releasing statements condemning the plans and the clubs for their involvement. On 19 April, a crowd of about 700 fans appeared outside Elland Road despite COVID-19 restrictions, ahead of the scheduled match between Leeds United and Liverpool, to protest against the European Super League. A banner in the stands stated: "Earn it on the pitch, football is for the fans." The Athletic later reported that shirts which read the slogan were approved by the Premier League. On 20 April, more than a thousand Chelsea fans joined protests outside Stamford Bridge ahead of Chelsea's game against Brighton & Hove Albion and the team buses of both clubs were blocked from entering the stadium. Shortly after, it was relayed to the gathered fans that Chelsea would withdraw from the Super League, leading to an outpour of celebration.

== Aftermath ==
=== Legal issues ===
On 19 April 2021, Aleksander Čeferin stated that UEFA would begin making "legal assessments" on the following day, and that the organisation would look to ban the twelve Super League clubs "as soon as possible." However, the Super League informed UEFA and FIFA that they had begun legal action to prevent the competition from being thwarted. Jesper Møller, chairman of the Danish Football Association and UEFA Executive Committee member, stated that he expected the three Super League clubs in the semi-finals of the 2020–21 UEFA Champions League (Chelsea, Manchester City, and Real Madrid) to be expelled from the competition by 23 April. In addition, he also expected Arsenal and Manchester United to be expelled from the semi-finals of the 2020–21 UEFA Europa League. In response, Super League chairman Florentino Pérez said that this would be "impossible" and that the law protects them. On 20 April, ESPN reported that UEFA decided not to ban the Super League teams from the Champions League and Europa League, and the matches would proceed as scheduled.

The Super League also sparked discussion whether it violates anti-trust laws since it contains business practices that are allegedly designed to reduce competition, by creating a protected market that restricts others from entering that may limit competition. The European Commission stated that it does not plan to investigate the Super League for anti-trust violations. Bloomberg News columnist Alex Webb argued that the European Commission's lack of investigation was justified; if a case against the Super League failed, other parties could interpret the case as condoning the Super League, and the European Commission could face popular backlash.

Sports lawyer Daniel Geey speculated that the UEFA and the European Super League as well as the European Club Association, FIFA and FIFPro were involved in "a high-stakes game of negotiation", and that the launch of the Super League was not guaranteed. Recalling a conversation with an unidentified lawyer, Sky Sports reporter Geraint Hughes stated that the main arguments for both sides would deal with competition law; UEFA would argue that the Super League would effectively be a closed league and an abuse of power from involved clubs, while the Super League would argue that restrictive conditions imposed by UEFA or FIFA would be anti-competitive. Hughes also stated that, in the lawyer's opinion, the Super League would have a slight advantage in a hypothetical case under current European Union law; if there was a change in the interpretation of EU law, then UEFA could win.

On 20 April, a Spanish commercial court based in Madrid with territorial jurisdiction published a medida cautelarísima (very urgent precautionary measure) with legal value and executive into the entire European Union through the 2007 Lugano Convention, ruling that Swiss-based UEFA and FIFA, any other associated football body, and/or any league council directly or indirectly associated with these cannot publish press notes and/or interviews against the Super League project and its founding members, cannot block the launch of the Super League, and cannot sanction any of its founding clubs, its managers personnel, and its footballers, based on articles 45, 49, 56 and 63 of the Treaty on the Functioning of the European Union (TFEU), until the court has fully considered the case. The Super League believed that some of the rules its founding clubs were subject to were not legally sound, and they planned to test its efficacy in the European courts.

On 13 May, the Spanish commercial court referred a cuestión preliminar (preliminary question) to the CJEU on whether FIFA and UEFA have violated articles 101 and 102 of the TFEU, denouncing UEFA's monopoly position as the solely governing, disciplinary institution and unique clubs' income distributor, a triple charge referred to as illegal according to the European Union competition law. The court also denounced UEFA's abuse of its dominant position by opposing the Super League project, such as using coercion to press the founding clubs to abandon the project in favour of UEFA, publishing sanctions against nine of the founding clubs (Arsenal, Atlético Madrid, Chelsea, Inter Milan, Liverpool, Manchester City, Manchester United, AC Milan and Tottenham Hotspur), and threatening the exclusion from all UEFA competitions for up to two years to the three still active clubs (Barcelona, Juventus and Real Madrid) based in a potential violation of the articles 49 and 51 of UEFA's statutes, which are objected by the Super League as monopolistic since they give UEFA exclusive control in European football. By imposing sanctions, UEFA ignored the injunction previously filed by the Spanish court almost a month before, resulting in the case being taken to the CJEU. On 7 June, the Swiss Federal Department of Justice and Police notified the Spanish precautionary measure to both governing bodies, ruling them not to execute sanctions against Barcelona, Juventus and Real Madrid.

On 27 September, after UEFA received an ultimatum from the Spanish commercial court to ban it from taking any disciplinary action against Barcelona, Juventus and Real Madrid; and nullify the sanctions against the other Super League-associated clubs; the European governing body announced that it had abandoned its proceedings against the three clubs, and would not request payment of the sums offered by the other nine founding teams. Both UEFA and La Liga have challenged the judge Ruiz de Lara, arguing that he is not impartial and that in the exercise of his jurisdictional function, he shows a clear bias towards the claims of the plaintiff European Super League Company S.L. ("ESL").

On 15 December 2022, Athanasios Rantos, advocate general for the European Court of Justice (CJEU), issued a report stating that FIFA's and UEFA's regulations were "compatible with EU competition law," with a final judgment from the Grand Chamber first expected to come in spring but yet to be announced. According to lawyer Rantos' report, the FIFA and UEFA regulations do not conflict with the European Union's competition rules, and, moreover, national federations have the power to veto the participation in competitions of clubs competing in the Super League. After giving his opinion, the Advocate General's ruling does not always align with the decision made by the judges but is said to typically agree with it about 80% of the time. UEFA's legal sources suggest that the judges will likely follow the general counsel's perspective based on the strong manner in which the opinion was delivered.

In January 2023, a Madrid court backed an earlier order for FIFA and UEFA not to carry out their threats to punish teams and players taking part in the project. FIFA and UEFA have been described as "trying to sustain a monopoly" and "abusing their positions of dominance" against the European Super League. The European Court of Justice ruled in favor of the Super League on 21 December, arguing that UEFA and FIFA's rules that ban clubs from joining rival competitions were arbitrary and unjustified.

=== Major changes ===
Spearheaded by Florentino Pérez of Real Madrid and Andrea Agnelli of Juventus, the Super League was in the works for three years; however, the final phases were rushed, and allegiance among the twelve clubs, instead of the fifteen as originally planned, seemed to have been forged under pressure. The announcement was unexpectedly poorly planned, devoid of real content, and the coalition, liable to break under pressure, came apart quickly.

On 20 April 2021 at 7 pm GMT, Chelsea publicly signalled their intention to withdraw from the Super League after chairman Bruce Buck met with the players. Thirty minutes later, Manchester City were the first team to formally commence procedures to withdraw from the Super League. Arsenal, Liverpool, Manchester United and Tottenham Hotspur followed soon after, while Chelsea was the last English club to formally announce its withdrawal in the early hours of 21 April. The same day, Atlético Madrid, Inter Milan and AC Milan confirmed their exits. Three days into its founding, nine of the twelve clubs had announced their plans to withdraw, with just Juventus, Barcelona and Real Madrid remaining. According to leaked documents, the clubs breaching contracts are liable for £130 million in penalty fees.

The Super League also collapsed due to global politics, with some news outlets, such as the Süddeutsche Zeitung, wondering whether the intervention of the new British and Russian governments was the real reason for the collapse, stating: "It was not at all just the protest of the football fans that brought the Super League down: it was also global politics. The idea of having their own league remains attractive for top clubs". As reported by the Süddeutsche Zeitung, Chelsea owner Roman Abramovich allegedly withdrew in light of his relations with Russia, which through Gazprom is a major sponsor of the UEFA Champions League. Manchester City allegedly pulled out as Saudi Arabia, which does not have a positive human rights image internationally, was thought to be a major financier for the league; JP Morgan dismissed the claims to The Daily Telegraph, and stated it was "sole financing the deal."

On 6 June 2023, Juventus announced their decision to leave the Super League after facing a rumoured five-year ban from all European competitions if they went through with the project. This now leaves only Barcelona and Real Madrid left in the project. Following Juventus' choice, A22 Sports announced it would present "irrefutable proofs" to the CJEU of coercion and abuse of power by UEFA against the Turin-based club, with an attempt from the governing body to ban the club from European competitions "from three to five seasons" if it remained a Super League member.

=== Club responses ===
After the English clubs withdrew on 21 April, the Super League stated: "Given the current circumstances, we shall reconsider the most appropriate steps to reshape the project, always having in mind our goals of offering fans the best experience possible while enhancing solidarity payments for the entire football community." Andrea Agnelli blamed the failure on Brexit, and stated that it was unlikely the Super League project would proceed in its current form, although he remained convinced of the "beauty of the project." Pérez reiterated that none of the founding clubs had officially left the association, as they were tied to binding contracts, and vowed to work with the governing bodies to make some form of the Super League work. Whilst blaming the English clubs for losing their nerve in the face of opposition and the footballing authorities for acting unjustifiably aggressively, Pérez insisted that the Super League project was merely on standby and not over. Barcelona president Joan Laporta echoed Pérez's sentiments that a Super League remains "absolutely necessary" for clubs to survive.

Following the opening of UEFA's disciplinary proceedings against Barcelona, Juventus and Real Madrid, the three clubs issued a joint statement strongly criticising UEFA, stating that the clubs "will not accept any form of coercion or intolerable pressure, while they remain strong in their willingness to debate, respectfully and through dialogue, the urgent solutions that football currently needs." On 31 May, the Super League, believing that UEFA and FIFA had breached EU competition laws by preventing the clubs from breaking away, filed an anti-competitive complaint to the CJEU against UEFA and FIFA for their proposals to stop the organisation of the competition. With the aim of establishing whether the two governing bodies have the exclusive right to organise competitions, the hearing could take up to two years, but the Super League feels confident about it, stating that "we will win that case based on precedent in other sports and it will pave the way for the Super League to eventually relaunch in a modified form".

In June 2021, regarding the six English clubs' owners who had withdrawn from the project after the government threatened legislation to block it, amid an intense backlash from fans and the media, the Super League was reported to have responded as such: "The owners know this is not the end — it's just the beginning. We will resume dialogue, whether this year or next year. It's just financial gravity. Football can't survive in its current form." In addition, it was reported that, as all twelve clubs remained tied by binding contracts, they were working on a modified version of the project. About these reports, Arsenal said: "We have been absolutely clear we are withdrawing from the ESL. This is subject to a legal process which is under way." Manchester United said: "The club has no intention to revisit the Super League concept. Any suggestion otherwise is simply an attempt to mislead our fans."

Arsenal chief executive Vinai Venkatesham met with fans and confirmed he had apologised to the fourteen other Premier League clubs, but that their reaction was rather lukewarm. Arsenal's head coach Mikel Arteta revealed that Stan Kroenke, the club's owner, personally apologised to the players and the coaching staff. Arsenal's board of directors wrote an open letter to fans stating to have made a mistake, apologised for it, and hoped to regain trust whilst assuring them of their commitment to rebuild the club. In an open letter from the owner Roman Abramovich and the board addressed to its fans, Chelsea wrote that they "deeply regret" the decision to join the Super League, but condemned the abuse received by club officials. The Chelsea Supporters Trust called for resignations from the club's board in light of the fiasco. Chelsea subsequently announced fan representation in board meetings.

Liverpool owner John W. Henry apologised to the fans, players and head coach Jürgen Klopp "for the disruption" caused by the club's decision to join the Super League. Dismissing the apology from the owners, supporters' group Spion Kop 1906 wrote that "the only reason they are sorry is because they have been caught out yet again", and demanded fan representation on the board. Klopp said of the owners: "[T]hey are not bad people. They made a bad decision."

Manchester United senior executive Ed Woodward allegedly resigned due to differences with the owners, the Glazer family, on the viability of the Super League, although some alleged that Woodward was involved in the plans for a breakaway league from the beginning. United's co-chairman Joel Glazer apologised "unreservedly" to fans shortly after their withdrawal was confirmed. The Manchester United Supporters' Trust criticized the owners.

In a message to fans, Manchester City chief executive Ferran Soriano said that the board deeply regretted its actions." In May 2021, Tottenham Hotspur released a statement saying that the project was put together in secret due to legal constraints in place, and it was merely a "framework agreement" that through dialogue with the FA, the Premier League, UEFA, FIFA, and the fans would have evolved into "something workable." They apologised "unreservedly" but expressed disappointment at Tottenham Hotspur Supporters' Trust for refusing to meet with club officials.

=== Consequences ===
Whilst the opposition from fans in Spain remained subdued, the supporters of the Premier League clubs, Arsenal, Liverpool, Manchester United and Tottenham Hotspur called on their owners to withdraw their investments. Manchester City were the first to withdraw from the ESL, thus gaining, according to reports, "brownie points" among their supporters. A few observers, such as Emlyon Business School professor of Eurasian Sport Simon Chadwick, deemed fan opposition of their respective clubs, which acted in self-preservation and with intentions to grow their investments, as naïve, simplistic and misplaced.

Executives from the Big Six resigned from various league committees after Richard Masters, CEO of the Premier League, called on them to either resign or be fired. Citing the trust deficit created as a result of the attempted breakaway, other Premier League clubs called for layoffs of key personnel employed by the Big Six. The FA commenced a formal inquiry against the Big Six, whilst the Premier League began revising its Owner's Charter to prevent similar attempts in the future. On 9 June, The Athletic reported that the Big Six had agreed to a collective £22 million fine in a settlement with the Premier League, with individual team fines of £25 million and 30-point deductions should any club agree to join a future breakaway league. On 10 June, The Times reported that the Home Office agreed to the FA's rules change to prevent breakaway leagues, such as non-British players for a future breakaway club in England having their work permits revoked.

Liga Nacional de Fútbol Profesional president Javier Tebas said: "I think that "the current ecosystem in Europe has worked," adding, on the other hand, that he agrees with the Super League on "some aspects such as the governance [of competitions and clubs]."

On 26 April 2021, the Italian Federation (FIGC) approved an ad hoc legislation to expel any team participating in breakaway leagues not recognised by FIFA, UEFA, or FIGC from Italian football. FIGC President Gabriele Gravina later confirmed that Juventus, the only still active club involved in the Super League from Italy, faces the possibility of expulsion from Serie A.

UEFA president Čeferin welcomed the breakaway clubs back after the Super League fallout, despite calls for a rollback of Champions League format changes that favor richer clubs. UEFA stipulated that these clubs must sell their Super League shares, donate €15 million to grassroots football and sign a Commitment Declaration, facing hefty fines for future violations. Disciplinary proceedings were initiated against Barcelona, Juventus and Real Madrid for their ongoing involvement in the Super League, but were stayed due to rulings from Spanish and Swiss courts. These clubs were eventually confirmed for the 2021–22 UEFA Champions League. A22 Sports Management filed a motion to scrap UEFA's agreement with nine clubs and to cancel the disciplinary case against the other three clubs. The 17th commercial court in Madrid ruled out potential sanctions from UEFA and FIFA for the Super League clubs. In September, following a Madrid court order, UEFA dropped its proceedings against Barcelona, Juventus and Real Madrid, and did not seek the payment offered by the other nine founding clubs.

On 22 June, as reported by The New York Times' Tariq Panja, A22 Sports Management filed a new motion on behalf of the Super League to the Spanish court, seeking to scrap the agreement UEFA signed with nine clubs, with UEFA being given five days to respond; it also sought to cancel in its entirety the disciplinary case against the other three clubs, which was suspended but currently pending UEFA's appeal against the court injunction. Moreover, a decision of the 17th commercial court in Madrid, which was made public on 1 July, ruled out the possibility of sanctions from UEFA and FIFA for the clubs involved in the project, given the antitrust issues which may occur were any punitive measures to be taken by the instances. On 27 September, after an order from a Madrid court to ban UEFA from taking any disciplinary action against Barcelona, Juventus and Real Madrid; UEFA announced that it had abandoned its proceedings against the three clubs, and would not request payment of the sums offered by the nine other founding clubs.

JP Morgan, the financier of the Super League's proposed $3.25 billion project, said they were taken aback by the opposition and "misjudged how this deal would be viewed by the wider football community." The bank's involvement prompted a sustainability rating agency to downgrade its assessment of JP Morgan's ethical performance. JP Morgan added they had no say in the project's strategy, but one person familiar with the matter said the Super League had plans to fund grassroots sports and community projects.

The British government announced its plans to commence "a fan-led review", to be led by former Minister for Sport Tracey Crouch, into governance of English football, which Boris Johnson described as a "root and branch investigation." The review also aims to examine potential changes to ownership models, such as the 50+1 rule employed in Germany. Jeremy Corbyn, former leader of the Labour Party, and Sadiq Khan, Mayor of London, came out in support of the review. The Premier League offered to cooperate with the British government. Paul Widdop, a senior lecturer in sports business at Manchester Metropolitan University, criticised the move, stating that while the incumbent government pursues a neo-liberalist agenda with every other industry, it seeks socialist reform only in football. Following the Super League's suspension, the BBC's Simon Stone said that a revised Super League concept could be tabled at some point in future, especially with clubs still seeking increased broadcast revenues received from matches.

=== Fan protests ===
Following the collapse of the European Super League, many fan groups in England continued protesting against the ownership of certain clubs and for the introduction of the 50+1 rule seen in German football. The first of these protests occurred on 19 April when fans of Manchester City and Manchester United held protests at the City of Manchester Stadium and Old Trafford, with both sets of fans unveiling banners and flags. On 22 April, a day after the Super League's suspension, a group of around twenty Manchester United fans gained access to the club's Trafford Training Centre in Carrington for over two hours, demanding that the Glazers sell the club.

On 23 April, a group of over 8,000 Arsenal fans gathered outside the Emirates Stadium, protesting for the removal of Stan Kroenke. In response to this, Josh Kroenke stated that the owners had no intention of selling their stake. The same day, a group of about of 100 Tottenham Hotspur supporters appeared outside the Tottenham Hotspur Stadium calling for the removal of Daniel Levy and the ENIC Group as owners. On 24 April, a group of around 2,000 Manchester United fans gathered outside Old Trafford to protest against the Glazers, the club owners. Ahead of the North West derby on 2 May, thousands of fans protested outside Old Trafford again, with an estimated 200 breaking into the stadium, which resulted in the game being postponed. Former Liverpool and Manchester United players expressed support for the fan-led protests.

On 25 April, Manchester City fans protested at Wembley ahead of their 2021 EFL Cup final against Tottenham Hotspur; banners reading "Sack the Board" and "Fans, Football, Owners, in that order" were unveiled.

=== Revival project ===
On 19 October 2022, A22 Sports Management, the Spain-based company that "sponsor[s]" and "assist[s]" in "the creation of the European Super League," appointed as chief executive officer Bernd Reichart, formerly the CEO of German broadcaster RTL. The same day, Reichart claimed the European Super League "would be relaunched within three years." He added that European football is "becoming unsustainable" under the "current system." After claiming that "European club-football is not living up to its potential", he stated that "permanent membership is off the table" and, instead, the "stakeholders" should discuss "an open competition based on sporting merit." UEFA responded that they had received a letter from A22 and "will consider the request for a meeting in due course," while the management of the Premier League directed interested parties to its 9 June 2021 statement, jointly signed with the FA, in which it was acknowledged that their member-clubs' actions to participate in a Super League were a "mistake" and, therefore, "the matter" has been brought "to a conclusion."

UEFA's meeting with A22 Sports Management took place on 8 November 2022, and was attended by representatives from all sectors to express their total disagreement with the Super League. The meeting was attended by around 30 people, including UEFA president Čeferin, Paris Saint-Germain's and European Club Association (ECA) chief Nasser Al-Khelaifi, La Liga president Tebas, and more than 20 senior officials from the ECA, continental leagues, supporters' groups and footballers' associations. They all said that they remain firmly against the Super League plan.

Former Bayern Munich footballer and ex-Bayern München AG executive chairman Karl-Heinz Rummenigge addressed the ESL as follows: "In football, you need to realize when the game is lost, and your game is lost forever". Al-Khelaifi of Paris Saint-Germain described the attempts of Super League's representative Reichart to reopen dialogue as "as if it were a broken record", stating that "football is not a legal contract, but a social contract. You have to respect the fans".

A manifesto for the proposed resurrection was published on 9 February 2023, stating the league would be a multi-divisional competition with promotion and relegations, with places being awarded "based on merit". The manifesto was met with criticism from the ECA, La Liga president Tebas and others, with the chief executive of the Football Supporters' Association stating "the walking corpse that is the European Super League twitches again."

Two weeks after the manifesto was made public, on 23 February, the British government announced that an "independent regulator" would be appointed, as was recommended by a 2022 fan-led review, whose mandate would be to "protect English football's cultural heritage." Among the regulator's explicit tasks shall be to stop "English clubs from joining closed-shop competitions, which are judged to harm the domestic game," in a clear reference to the European Super League. The Premier League stated, in response, that it is "vital" the regulator's actions do not lead to any "unintended consequences" that could affect the PL's "global appeal and success."

In Spain, in the same month, veteran sports-journalist Alfredo Relaño wrote an editorial in El País, discussing the league presented in 2022 by Reichart. Relaño opined that "it would be far from easy to replace" the European club competitions UEFA has been organizing since 1954, even if the European court decided in favor of ESL.

=== European Court of Justice decision ===
On 21 December 2023, the European Court of Justice issued decision C-333/21 according to which FIFA and UEFA rules on prior approval of interclub football competitions, such as the Super League, are contrary to European Union law. A report released in December 2022 by the ECJ found that the rules of football's European and world governing bodies were "compatible with EU competition law".

=== Football Governance Bill ===
In the King's speech on 17 July 2024, the British government announced plans for a "Football Governance Bill", which will, amongst other things, prevent English and Welsh clubs from "joining closed-shop, breakaway or unlicensed leagues, such as the European Super League". The Football Governance Act became law in July 2025.

== Club-by-club chronology ==
Sources

- 18 April 2021; 13:00–14:00: Reports emerge of 12 clubs forming a breakaway competition.
- 18 April 2021; 23:00: Official announcement of the competition and its 12 founding members:
  - (Italy) AC Milan
  - (England) Arsenal
  - (Spain) Atlético Madrid
  - (Spain) Barcelona
  - (England) Chelsea
  - (Italy) Inter Milan
  - (Italy) Juventus
  - (England) Liverpool
  - (England) Manchester City
  - (England) Manchester United
  - (Spain) Real Madrid
  - (England) Tottenham Hotspur
- 19 April 2021; 10:00–11:00: Further reports emerge that three additional clubs were invited, but declined to participate:
  - (Germany) Bayern Munich
  - (Germany) Borussia Dortmund
  - (France) Paris Saint-Germain

Bayern Munich and Borussia Dortmund almost immediately confirming they had denied the invitation.

- 20 April 2021; 18:00–19:00: Reports emerge that Chelsea and Manchester City have begun the withdrawal process following backlash.
- 20 April 2021; 21:23:
  - (England) Manchester City

officially withdraw.

- 20 April 2021; 22:55:
  - (England) Arsenal
  - (England) Liverpool
  - (England) Manchester United
  - (England) Tottenham Hotspur

officially withdraw.

- 21 April 2021; 00:45:
  - (England) Chelsea

officially withdraw.

- 21 April 2021; 11:27:
  - (Spain) Atlético Madrid
  - (Italy) Inter Milan

officially withdraw.

- 21 April 2021:
  - (Italy) AC Milan

officially withdraw.

- 15 October 2021: An announcement is made re-confirming the European Super League. Only three clubs remain in the project:
  - (Spain) Barcelona
  - (Italy) Juventus
  - (Spain) Real Madrid
- 1 June 2024:
  - (Italy) Juventus

officially withdraw.

- 7 February 2026:
  - (Spain) Barcelona

officially withdraw.

- 11 February 2026:
  - (Spain) Real Madrid

officially withdraw.

== Basketball plan for Europe ==
In May 2025, following the announcement by the NBA, FIBA and the EuroLeague that they'd be "holding talks" with European football clubs about creating an NBA-style basketball competition across Europe, various European clubs with basketball sections expressed interest in the suggested scheme, among them most prominently Real Madrid and Barcelona. Clubs, such as Chelsea, Paris Saint-Germain, and Manchester City, which had participated in the European Super League's beginnings, were reported to be interested to create basketball teams in order to participate in an "NBA-style" competition. NBA Europe director George Aivazoglou commented on "existing [football and basketball] brands that have a lot of value and prestige" and could "reach and impact hundreds of thousands or millions of people."

== See also ==
- Sport policies of the European Union
- FIBA–EuroLeague dispute
- OFC Professional League
- FIFA Forward Enterprise
- African Football League
- 1921-22 Prima Divisione, the historical case of a private secessionist football league in Italy

== Bibliography ==
- Vieli, André (2014). UEFA: 60 years at the heart of football (PDF). Nyon: UEFA. doi:10.22005/bcu.175315. Archived (PDF) from the original on 3 August 2021.
