= Proposals for a European Super League in association football =

Advocacy for new tier of European football

Proposals for a European Super League in association football consist of recurring attempts by individual teams or consortiums of association football clubs to advocate for the creation of an additional tier of European football outside of the traditional footballing pyramids of each national football association.

Starting in 1968 with a theoretical proposal by then UEFA general secretary Hans Bangerter to replace the European Champions Cup and the Cup Winners' Cup for a unique pan-continental championship. Since the late 1980s, various structural proposals — differing in format and eligibility rules — have been put forward at different times. Any proposals have traditionally been objected to by UEFA –despite its executives' involvement in favour of that– and FIFA as well as the national associations for being regarded potentially elitist.

Discussions about the potential for a sole European league gained force in the 1970s but drew legal traction only in the late of the following decade. The formation of the G-14 in 1998 and the rise of the European Club Forum (ECF), an UEFA task force composed by 102 clubs in 2002, including all G-14 members, both merged for constituting the European Club Association six years later; brought the collective bargaining power of Europe's biggest teams to obtain more income from the confederation, and combined with initial suggestions of a breakaway league concessions were earned. From 2009, Real Madrid president Florentino Pérez was a prominent public advocate for the idea; various discussions and proposals continued thereafter.

In April 2021, twelve clubs formally announced that they would be forming the European Super League to start in August of the same year. FIFA and the six continental confederations opposed the breakaway league. Many national associations, fan groups, players and other organisations publicly criticised the announcement. Following the withdrawals, the Super League project was suspended. The organisers subsequently initiated legal proceedings against UEFA, which became a matter for the Court of Justice of the European Union.

== Definition ==
In a stricter sense, the term "Super League" may refer to a US-style closed league, without a system of promotion and relegation. In a broader sense, it can also mean any kind of tier system in European football, where entry is offered not on the basis of titles, as it was done until 1997–98, but on the basis of good enough results and revenue. In this regard, the Champions League was defined by UEFA vice president Zbigniew Boniek in 2021 as an "open Super League" in terms of revenue and participating clubs.

In association football, the term "Super League" was introduced in the late 1980s by European mass media because the proposed format of that tournament was the same as that used in league championships, contrasted with the then-format of the seasonal European competitions, based exclusively on knockout phases since the mid-1950s.

== Background ==
=== Beginnings ===
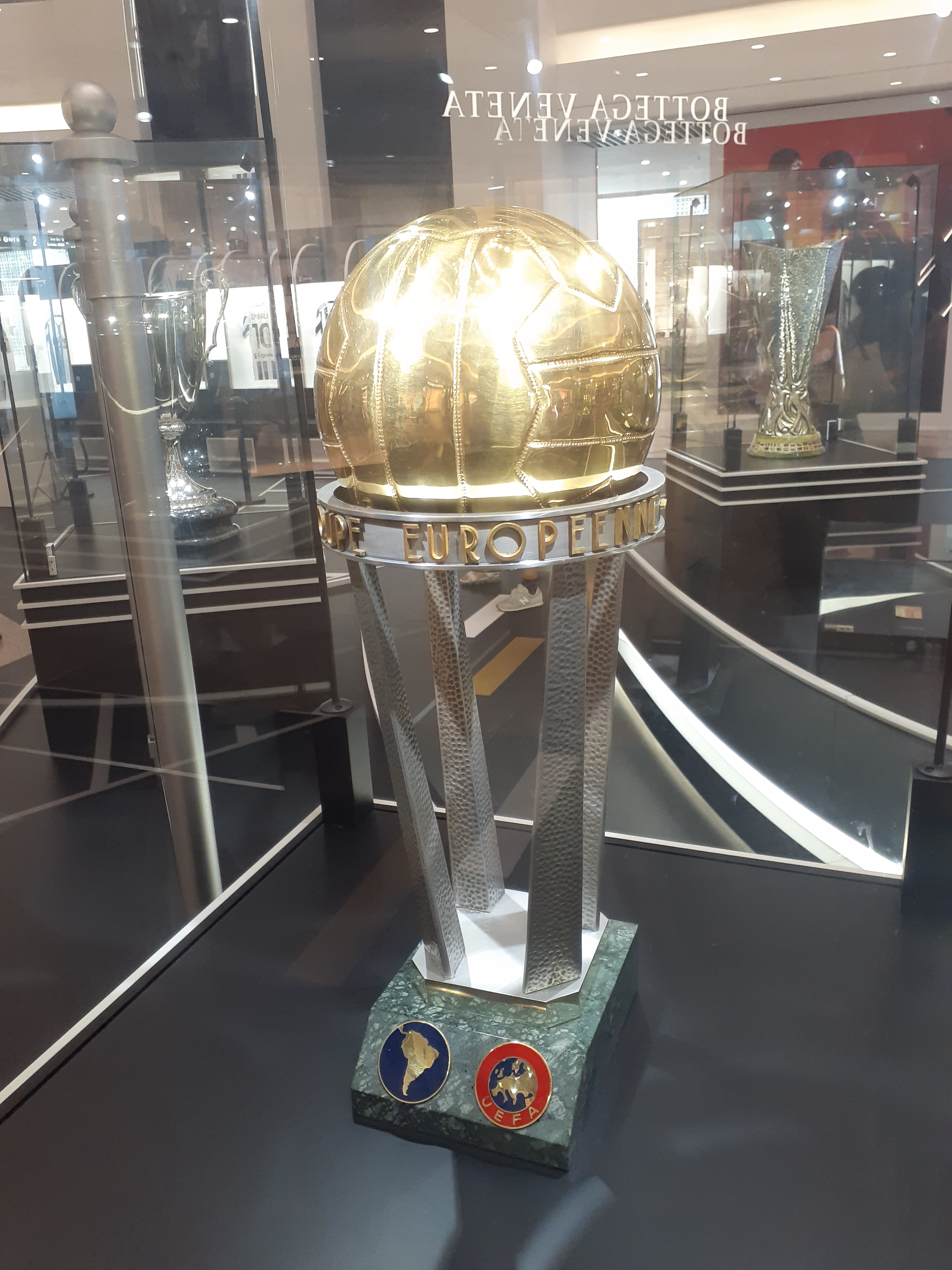
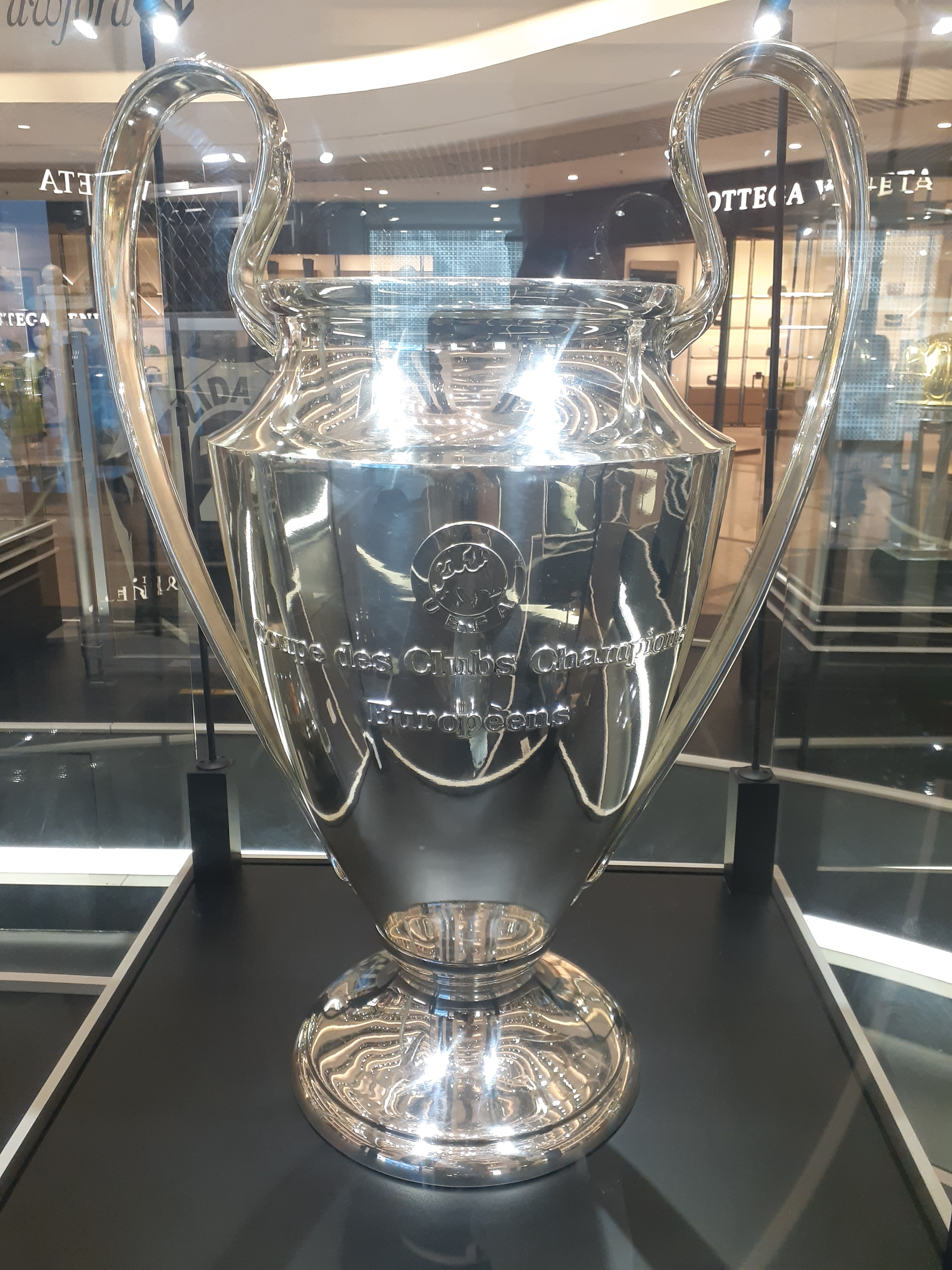
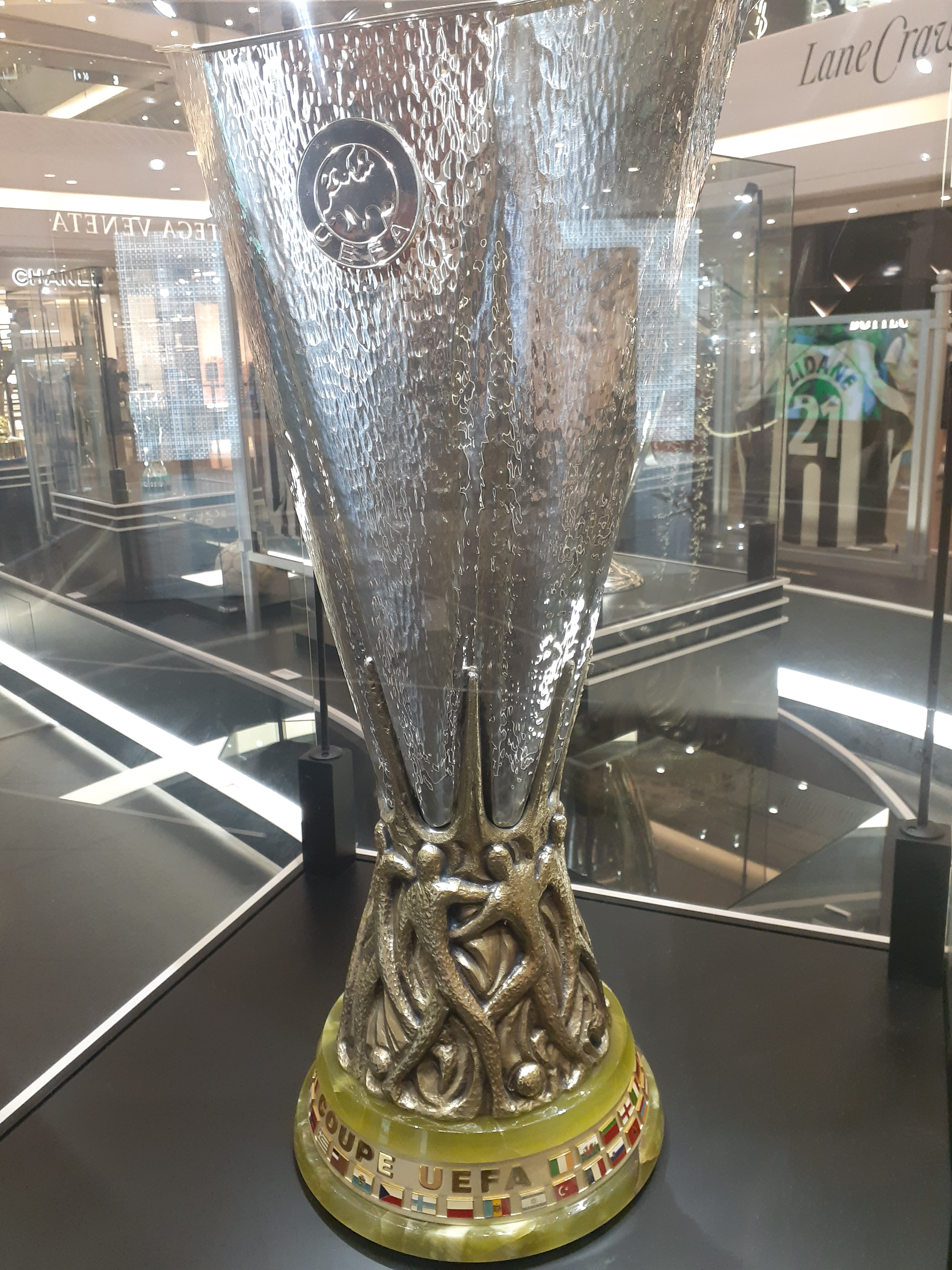
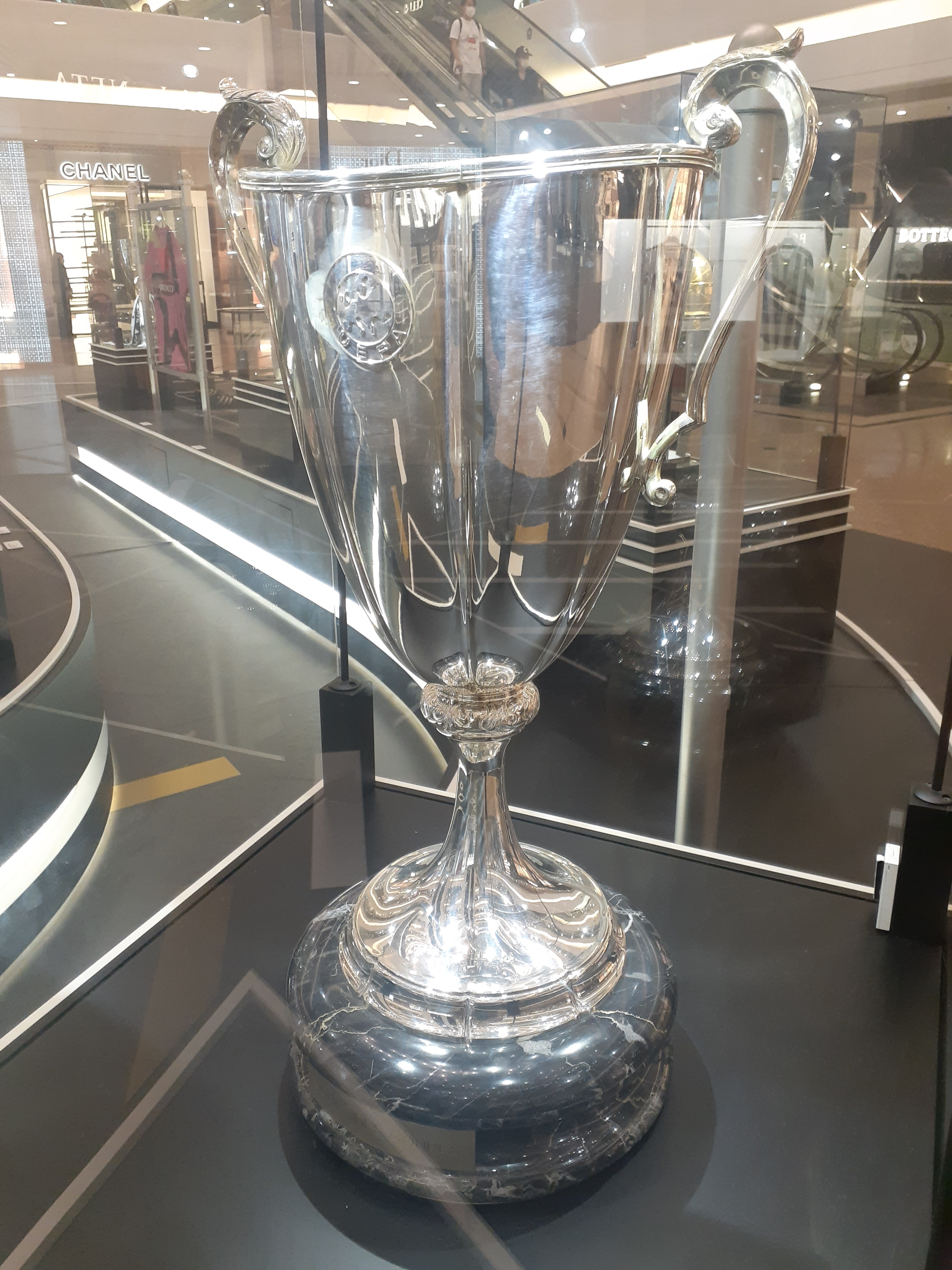
Clockwise from upper left: trophies of the Intercontinental Cup, the European Champions' Cup, the Cup Winners' Cup and the UEFA Cup during an exhibition held at Hong Kong (2021).

The first theoretical idea of a sole pan-European Football Championship for clubs, dubbed "European Football League Championship" was from the UEFA general secretary Hans Bangerter, who proposed a competition with a format based in a group and knockout stages in 1968 that would eventually replace the European Champions Cup and the Cup Winners' Cup. Despite that project was a novelty at the time, in that year UEFA approved expand the clubs' access to its competitions creating a third seasonal tournament: the UEFA Cup, which inaugural season took place three years later.

From 1971 to 1991, there were three seasonal European competitions, solely based on knockout rounds (double-legged single-elimination tournament), whose access was based on three distinctions (title holders not included):

1. The European Champions Cup, which was reserved to national league champions only.
2. The Cup Winners' Cup, which was mostly reserved to national cup winners.
3. The UEFA Cup, which was reserved to a maximum of four best-placed teams from the best competing leagues (based on confederation coefficient score) that didn't qualify to either of the other two competitions, as well as national league cup winners from countries that organized one.

Although the European Champions Cup was regarded as the most prestigious, as its title holders were paired with their South American counterparts in the Intercontinental Cup for the inter-club world title and the UEFA Cup was the tournament that gained the most commercial revenue and the highest TV share, as well as described as the most difficult European competition to win due its unpredictability, its contestants' level and having different winning teams each season; the general level of the three competitions was even. Additionally, the European Champions Cup winners faced with the Cup Winners' Cup winners for the then-two-legged UEFA Super Cup.

Unlike the European Champions Cup and the UEFA Cup, the Cup Winners' Cup did not take into account the clubs' results in the national top league, so it eventually allowed the participation of clubs from lower division leagues should they won the national association cups; they could even qualify by just advancing to the final in the national association cups should the opponent had won the league title and entered the European Champions Cup.

=== Georges UEFA presidency (1983–1990) ===
In 1987, then AC Milan owner Silvio Berlusconi, Real Madrid president Ramón Mendoza and Glasgow Rangers secretary Campbell Ogilvie concluded the European Champions Cup format "obsolete" and proposed to UEFA, led by its president Jacques Georges, to create a new competition with a single round-robin format –dubbed the "Super League"– that would be more attractive for international television broadcasters, would be able to allow the contestant teams to earn more income, and would give them more possibilities to progress through it for "economical and management guarantees". It would run parallel to the then three European competitions since the 1991–92 season. In 1990, Mendoza officially presented the project to the confederation and, according to an article published by Scotland on Sunday, UEFA was to agree with it after reach a deal with Bayern Munich, Madrid and Milan, among other clubs; but the confederation rejected that project in 1991 and, after being punished in economic terms, Berlusconi and Mendoza and announced sporting sanctions sine die for both clubs, reformed the competition introducing a group stage in that season, increasing the overall number of matches, and rebranding it as the UEFA Champions League in 1992 for commercial and media purposes. Despite that reform, the dissolutions of the Soviet Union and Czechoslovakia as well as the breakup of Yugoslavia between 1991 and 1993 drastically affected the sporting level in all these countries, significantly increasing the number of clubs involved in international competitions – representing up to 22 of its former constituent states – although all of them with a lower sporting level than that shown by Eastern European clubs until the early 1990s, which meant that their play-offs against teams from more powerful leagues generated lesser expectation from fans and media, with audiences for the UEFA competitions, as a consequence, significantly decreasing.

=== Johansson UEFA presidency (1990–2007) ===
Under the presidency of Lennart Johansson (1990–2007), UEFA transformed the European competitions towards a two-tier system:

- In 1991–92, a late eight-team group stage replaced quarterfinals and semifinals.
- In 1992–93, the UEFA Champions League was set up, with a centralized broadcasting regime, branding, and prize allocation.
- In 1993–94, semifinals after the group stage were added.
- In 1994–95, the Champions League format was wholly revised, with a 16-team group stage in the Autumn, and knockout rounds in the Spring.
- In 1997–98, the Champions League format was expanded to 24 clubs, with entry allowed to eight league runners-up (for the first time), which up to then qualified for the UEFA Cup.
- The Cup Winners' Cup was abolished with the last competition held in 1998–99.
- In 1999–2000, the Champions League format was expanded to 32 clubs and two successive group stages, with entry now possible to 15 league runners-up, six third-placed, three fourth-placed. Special entry to the UEFA Cup knockout rounds was given to group stage losers as a consolation ticket.

In 1993, Johansson proposed, unsuccessfully, to merge all three seasonal competitions in a unique championship which the better teams in the continent would be involved. Three years later, clubs such as Ajax, Barcelona, Bayern Munich and Manchester United secretly planned to replace the Champions League, with a "Super League" with 36 "prominent" clubs split in three groups and a play-off stage for the title at the end of the season, as well as a second competition for 96 other teams, called the "ProCup", to replace the Cup Winners' Cup and the UEFA Cup. Both planned tournaments, based on the North American sports system, would be sponsored by Italian corporation Media Partners, but that project was abandoned after FIFA, UEFA and its affiliated national associations announced sanctions against all involved clubs in it.

In 1995, the continuity of the Cup Winners' Cup began to be officially discussed by the associations towards UEFA, due the competition's level, prestige and general interest (including among the strongest clubs in financial terms which benefited from the Bosman ruling) declining significantly compared to the other two confederation competitions, mainly during the decade, a period in which the format of its qualification system was frequent and was therefore not considered attractive for sponsorship, thus affecting the prestige of the domestic cups. This and the Super League project led to the transformation of the Champions League between 1997 and 1999 from a knockout competition restricted to league champions to a multi-phase system open to non-champions was influenced by the threat of a super league; an advocacy group not recognized by UEFA nor FIFA named the G-14, formed by the then-first 14 clubs in the continent in terms of official titles won and its potential international fanbase, had been set up in 1998, and threatened to form a break-away league if their demands were not met. As a reaction, UEFA created the European Club Football 2000, a task force led by then UEFA general secretary Gerhard Aigner and renamed in 2002 as the European Club Forum (ECF), that included 102 clubs from the continent including 11 elected clubs according their UEFA coefficient score. All those clubs to have won five of more official international titles were ECF's permanent members and gained representation in the confederation's Competitions Organising Committee. That same year, Media Partners seriously investigated the idea of a closed European Super League. The plan died after UEFA moved to expand the Champions League and decided the Cup Winners' Cup would be absorbed by the UEFA Cup in order to better accommodate clubs that were considering defecting in order to join the proposed Super League in an attempt to redesign of confederation competitions, in 1999.

"The UEFA Cup is a consolation prize and the Cup Winners' Cup has been destroyed. Who plays in that now? Nobody. The fact is, the Champions League is all-important. It is turning into a European League and over the next three or four years I think that will become more and more clear."

— Arsène Wenger on the climate of European football, October 1997.

By the year 2000, the Champions League gathered the best-placed teams of the best competing leagues – to a maximum of four according each country's coefficient score –, in which the most powerful leagues of the continent (English, French, German, Italian and Spanish) would gradually benefit the most, while the remaining competition, the UEFA Cup, was fought by the next-best-placed league teams and the national cup winners. Since then, the successive restructuring of the Champions League format, which resulted in eliminated clubs from its group stage being reallocated into the UEFA Cup (that reassignment was limited to the competition's qualifying rounds since 1994–95 season "as compensation", "for add extra interest [to the UEFA Cup] and [because] the eliminated clubs often offer good value", was strongly criticized by mass media and fans), and established a considerable difference between both competitions at sporting level, financial income and media visibility in favour of the Champions League, in addition to constituting, de facto, a first and second division within UEFA clubs. Also, a summer competition, the UEFA Intertoto Cup (1995–2008), provided access to the UEFA Cup to the next willing teams of each country (by league position) not qualified.

=== Platini UEFA presidency (2007–2015) ===
In 2007, Michel Platini was elected president of UEFA with the support of many of the nations with the lowest UEFA coefficient, to whom he promised a fairer access list and various reforms to tackle the influence of big money. Platini tried to curtail the influence of the G-14 lobbying group, which had to open up and merge with ECF to become the European Club Association in 2008. Nonetheless, the two-tier structure was not fundamentally altered by the reforms:

- In 2003–04, the Champions League second group stage is replaced by a double-legged Round of 16.
- In 2009–10, the Champions League access list is wholly revised, with 3 third-placed gaining direct entry; on the other hand, to make sure that a broader number of leagues could be represented in the group stage, a "Champions Path" is created.
- For similar reasons, due to the competition being mediatically overshadowed by the Champions League, the UEFA Cup was rebranded as the Europa League, with a centralized broadcasting regime, a proper brand identity and prize allocation. 48 clubs took part in the group stage. Additionally, since the 2014–15 season, the competition winner qualified for the following season's Champions League.
- The UEFA Financial Fair Play Regulations is agreed to in 2009 and is implemented beginning in 2011–12.
- Starting from 2015–16, Europa League title holders are given a direct berth in the Champions League group stage.

=== Čeferin UEFA presidency (2016–present) ===
In 2016, Aleksander Čeferin became President of UEFA. Also, in that year, the confederation again discussed the possibility of creating a closed league containing the 16 best clubs in European football from the highest ranked national leagues. These 16 clubs would have been divided into two groups of eight teams each. After 56 games in each group under the round-robin tournament system, the teams finishing in places 1–4 would qualify for the quarter-finals. That plan was finally rejected and UEFA, in order to avoid the creation of a Super League, made changes to the structure of the Champions League for the 2018–21 trade cycle:

- Since 2018–19, due to pressure from the bigger clubs, the fourth-placed teams from the top 4 leagues are given direct access to the group stage, reducing the number of berths granted through the qualifying rounds to six.
- Since 2021–22, a new competition called the UEFA Europa Conference League was created to give the teams of the leagues with the lowest coefficient score with a proper competition to allow more media attention and to facilitate the commercialization of TV rights to the 2021–2024 confederation's competitions cycle with a "stronger" Europa League group stage reducing from 48 to 32 the number of participating clubs. Similar to the former UEFA Intertoto Cup, its winner will qualify to the Europa League the next season. The tournament has also a centralized broadcasting regime, brand identity and prize allocation. UEFA has been criticised by having created the competition for political purposes and gaining support of the lowest confederation ranked leagues, which their teams take part in, against the 2021 European Super League project. Also, it was criticised for its complicated qualification system, being regarded by the mass media, as well a group of football personnel and fans as a "consolation trophy" for the teams who finished in third place in the Europa League group stage and for its minor income compared with the offered by the other two seasonal confederation competitions. However, UEFA considered the competition to "reflect" an all-inclusive European football system, in contrast of a, at the time, a close "elitist" Super League.

Since 2018, discussions to completely reshape the UEFA club competitions were held, culminating in the European Super League break-away attempt (Officially known as "The Super League") a few days before the final vote. Although the break-away was averted, the reform finally voted on includes many of the proposals made by the wealthiest. Beginning in the 2024–25 season, the group stages for each of the three competitions would be replaced by unique leagues of 36 clubs each facing 10 others in a Swiss system. The top 8 would qualify for the Round of 16, while the next 16 (9th to 24th) would qualify for the playoff round.

By the 2021–22 season, there were three European competitions composed each of a 32-team group stage and a knockout system that included the relegation of some eliminated clubs to the immediate lower tournament and the qualification of the winning team to the immediate higher tier the successive season, creating for the first time since the disbanding of the Cup Winners Cup a three-tier pyramidal structure in the European competitions. However, as of the 2024–25 season, there are three European competitions composed each of a 36-team league phase and a knockout system that does not include the relegation of eliminated clubs to the immediate lower tournament since the competitions' league phase, but the "relegation" system remains in the qualification rounds and the "promotion" to the competitions winner remains.

== History ==
Legal proposals of a Super League were voiced since at least the late 1960s, by various club presidents and key actors.

=== Florentino Pérez (2009) ===
In July 2009, Real Madrid's Florentino Pérez championed the idea. He criticised the current Champions League, saying: "We have to agree a new European Super League which guarantees that the best always play the best – something that does not happen in the Champions League." Perez stated that he would push for a break-away competition featuring Europe's traditional powerhouses if UEFA didn't do more to ensure these teams played each other annually.

Under Perez's plan, the continent's best teams would remain part of their respective national systems, but would be guaranteed the opportunity to play each other at the conclusion of the regular league season.

=== Various opinions ===
In August 2009, Arsenal manager Arsène Wenger predicted a super league would become reality within ten years time due to revenue pressure on the continent's elite teams.

In February 2012, Clarence Seedorf also predicted the inception of the competition, and gave it his backing.

In April 2013, Scotland manager Gordon Strachan said that he believes the Old Firm clubs of Celtic and Rangers would join a future new 38-club two-division European super league.

=== Stephen M. Ross (2016) ===
In 2016, representatives from Premier League clubs Arsenal, Chelsea, Liverpool, Manchester City, and Manchester United were seen leaving a meeting with Stephen M. Ross' representatives that discussed the proposition of a European super league.

=== 2018 leaks ===
In November 2018, Football Leaks claimed that there had been undercover talks about the creation of a new continental club competition, the European Super League, which would begin play in 2021. In October 2020, it was revealed that Liverpool and Manchester United were spearheading the Project Big Picture, a plan to revolutionise the finances and structure of English football from the top down; the plan was voted down by at least 14 Premier League clubs during an emergency meeting.

=== 2021 European Super League ===
A22 Sports Management S.L.
- Type: Limited liability company
- Industry: Sport
- Founded: 1 September 2022; 3 years ago
- Founder: Anas Laghrari; John Hahn
- Headquarters: José Ortega y Gasset, 29, Fifth Floor, 28006, Madrid, Spain
- Area served: Europe
- Key people: Bernd Reichart (CEO)
- Website: a22sports.com

In October 2020, Sky Sports claimed that FIFA was proposing a replacement for the UEFA Champions League called the European Premier League involving up to 18 teams in a round-robin tournament system and post-league playoff-style knockout tournament with no relegation similar to major league sports competitions in the United States. English Premier League clubs as well as clubs from Spain, Italy, France, and Germany were invited. Barcelona accepted the proposal for it to join the Super League the day before its president Josep Maria Bartomeu resigned.

On 21 January 2021, FIFA and all six of football's continental confederations (AFC, CAF, CONCACAF, CONMEBOL, OFC, and UEFA) issued a statement rejecting the formation of any breakaway European Super League; any club or player involved in such a league would be banned from any competitions organised by FIFA or any of the six confederations. The proposal nevertheless remained under discussion by clubs such as Manchester United and Liverpool; the proposal document indicated that such a league would start in the 2022–23 season, with 15 members who compete directly in the first seasons, including six Premier League clubs, and each club would be paid up to £310 million to join followed by up to £213 million per season, and other five clubs would gain access based on their results in the own league competitions.

On 18 April 2021, an official press release announced the formation of the league. Twelve clubs, including English clubs (Arsenal, Chelsea, Liverpool, Manchester City, Manchester United, and Tottenham Hotspur), Italian clubs (Inter Milan, Juventus, and Milan), and Spanish clubs (Atlético Madrid, Barcelona, and Real Madrid), were named as founding members, with a 20-team league being envisioned. The New York Times reported that each team would earn over $400 million (£290M) for entering the competition. The reports generated negative reaction from UEFA and the football associations and the first-tier football leagues of England, Italy, and Spain, who issued a joint statement stating that they would not allow the Super League to proceed. UEFA also reiterated that any clubs involved in a Super League would be banned from all other domestic, European, and world competitions, and their players could be denied the opportunity to represent their national teams. French President Emmanuel Macron and British Prime Minister Boris Johnson also expressed opposition to the plan. Fans also expressed opposition. Amidst widespread opposition, participating teams began to withdraw from the Super League and it suspended its operations three days after being officially announced.

==== Reception and legal issues ====
The idea of the first-officially announced Super League has been criticised by fans and critics for its perceived elitism and potentially devastating effect on domestic leagues, the UEFA Champions League, and smaller clubs; it is viewed in some quarters as simply a "power grab" by bigger clubs for more money and control over football.

Germany and Real Madrid midfielder Toni Kroos criticised the plans in 2020, saying "the gap between the big clubs and small will expand even more. Everything does not always have to be faster, with more and more money." Kroos' long-time Germany teammate and former Bayern Munich footballer Philipp Lahm wishes to see a "cosmopolitan" line-up to a potential Super League, opining: "But just as players from Istanbul, Warsaw and Bratislava get their shot in the Euros, would it not be better to include teams from Bruges, Saint Petersburg, Athens, Copenhagen and Prague in a European league?"

At the Financial Times' Business of Football summit in February 2021, Simon Green, the head of BT Sport, the UEFA Champions League rights holder in the UK, cautioned that a Super League "wouldn't be worth as much as the existing leagues and Champions League are at the moment." Paul Widdop, a senior lecturer in sports business at Manchester Metropolitan University, criticised the intervention of the British government, stating that while the incumbent government pursues a neo-liberalist agenda with every other industry, it seeks socialist reform only in football. Michael Cox argued in The Athletic that the European Super League would help restore completive balance in European football due to the widening gap between big, rich clubs and smaller, poorer clubs in domestic leagues, and this inequality would only increase as time goes on without a Super League.

The announcement of the Super League in 2021 drew widespread opposition from fans, players, other clubs, FIFA, UEFA and national governments. The Super League announced it was suspending its operations three days after being officially announced. Some analysts stated that the British government intervention, which some such as Alex Webb arguing that a diminished Premier League due to the Super League could hurt Britain's soft power as well, led to a domino effect by causing the English Big Six to withdraw after the Football Association threatened to ban participating clubs from domestic football, and causing all but three clubs (Barcelona, Juventus, and Real Madrid) to withdraw with the project not able proceed and therefore had to be put on standby. Nonetheless, Pérez stated that none of the founding clubs had officially left the association, even as they were sanctioned by UEFA and signed Commitment Declaration to pay €100 million if they were ever to join an unauthorised competition, as they were tied to binding contracts, and vowed to work with the governing bodies to make some form of the Super League work, whilst blaming the English clubs of losing their nerve in face of opposition and the footballing authorities for acting unjustifiably aggressively.

On 31 May, the Super League filed a complaint to the Court of Justice of the European Union (CJEU) against UEFA and FIFA for their proposals to stop the organisation of the competition. On June 7, the Swiss Federal Department of Justice and Police notified the Spanish precautionary measure, which had earlier issued an injunction against UEFA and FIFA, and referred a cuestión preliminar (English: preliminary question) to the CJEU on whether UEFA and FIFA have violated articles 101 and 102 of the TFEU, to both governing bodies, ruling them to not execute sanctions against clubs still active in the project; UEFA had opened disciplinary proceedings against Barcelona, Juventus, and Real Madrid, which were threatened to be excluded from all UEFA competitions, in order to sanction them but these measures were stayed until further notice by UEFA's Appeals Body as a result of the rulings from the Spanish commercial court and Swiss authorities. In December 2023, a final decision by the European Court of Justice stated that FIFA and UEFA's rules that banned clubs from joining rival competitions, such as the Super League, were unlawful.

== See also ==
- Atlantic League (football)

== Bibliography ==
- Vieli, André (2014). "UEFA: 60 years at the heart of football" (PDF). Patrinum. Nyon: Union des Associations Européennes de Football. doi:10.22005/bcu.175315. Archived (PDF) from the original on 3 August 2021.
