= Tariq Panja =

British journalist

Tariq Panja is a journalist and a global sports reporter for The New York Times based in London.

== Career ==
Panja began his journalism career as a general news reporter at the Manchester Evening News in 2004 before joining the Associated Press as a news reporter in 2005. He also had a short stint at the pan-European broadcaster Eurosport.

He left to cover sports news for Bloomberg LP in 2008 and he broke a string of exclusives surrounding corruption at football's world governing body, FIFA. He moved to The New York Times as a sports reporter in 2017 at the insistence of assistant sports editor Andrew Das.

Panja co-authored Football's Secret Trade: How the Player Transfer Market was Infiltrated, published by Bloomberg in 2017, with Alex Duff. Later that year, he made the shortlist for the media category at the Asian Football Awards. He is a regular contributor to NPR.

== Personal life ==
According to a June 2026 episode of The Weekly Show with Jon Stewart, Panja said his family was part of the Indian diaspora who had emigrated to England.
