= Daniel Geey =

English sports lawyer

Daniel Geey is an English sports lawyer.

== Early life ==
Geey studied law and politics at the University of Manchester.

== Career ==
In 2005, after obtaining a football broadcasting rights master's degree, Geey joined the international legal firm Jones Day. After that, Geey started working as a lawyer with footballers and football clubs. He is a partner with the Sheridans Sport, Entertainment & eSports Team.

Geey has appeared on television for BBC, BT Sport, and Sky Sports to explain legal matters in football. He has also explained various matters in football for the websites CNN, Eurosport, and Talksport. He is the chairman of the football charity Football Aid.

== Personal life ==
Geey is of Jewish descent and is the husband of 2019 Maccabi European Games winner Hollie Geey.
