= European Football Clubs =

Sports organization of association football clubs in Europe

- Predecessor: G-14 and European Club Forum
- Formation: January 2008; 18 years ago
- Type: Sports organization
- Headquarters: Nyon, Switzerland
- Members: over 800 clubs
- Chairman: (Qatar) Nasser Al-Khelaifi
- Affiliations: UEFA
- Website: efcfootball.com

European Football Clubs (EFC), formerly known as the European Club Association (ECA), is an organisation that is officially recognised by both UEFA and FIFA as the sole, independent body for association football clubs within Europe.

== History ==
Formed on the merge of the G-14 group with the European Club Forum, a task force created by UEFA in 2002 to bring together 102 member clubs in January 2008. Karl-Heinz Rummenigge served as acting chairman until he was officially elected chairman when the ECA's 103 members met for the first time on 7–8 July 2008 at UEFA headquarters in Nyon, Switzerland.

Former European Club Association logo

Karl-Heinz Rummenigge was the acting chairman before officially being elected chairman of the ECA when its 103 members met for the first time on the 7–8 July 2008 at UEFA headquarters in Nyon, Switzerland. In addition to replacing the G-14, which was dissolved in favour of the ECA on 15 February 2008, the new ECA also replaces UEFA's European Club Forum (of which Karl-Heinz Rummenigge was also chairman).

The European Club Forum utilised a similar membership selection process as the European Club Association, with 102 members picked every two years. In April 2021 following the announcement of the European Super League, several of the clubs involved resigned from the ECA. The ECA had criticised the formation of the new league. On 7 May 2021, UEFA approved reintegration measures for nine clubs involved in that breakaway competition.

As of March 2023, there were 512 ECA members including 135 ordinary, 169 associated in addition to 208 network clubs and 40 women's clubs. On 1 June 2024, it was reported that Juventus would rejoin the ECA starting from July, following their withdrawal as part of the Super League project in 2021.

On 7 October 2025, the European Club Association (ECA) rebranded as European Football Clubs (EFC), representing over 800 member clubs across 55 nations, including 139 women's clubs.

On 13 February 2026, Barcelona were reinstated as an Ordinary Member after withdrawing from the Super League project.

== Structure ==
=== List of chairmen ===
President	Term
(Germany) Karl-Heinz Rummenigge	2008–2017
(Italy) Andrea Agnelli	2017–2021
(Qatar) Nasser Al-Khelaifi	2021–present

=== Working Groups ===
The Working Groups are an important cornerstone of EFC's organisational structure as they provide active advice and support not only to the Executive Board, but also to EFC representatives participating in UEFA, FIFA and EU committees and working groups. Their contribution is key and strategic to the association. All working groups are made up of both Ordinary Member and Associated Member Clubs from all four subdivisions. Alongside EFC Working Groups, dedicated Task Forces give assistance on specific matters, which require urgent decision-making.

== Executive Committee ==
Member	Position	Role
(Qatar) Nasser Al-Khelaïfi	Chairman	President of Paris Saint-Germain F.C.
(Germany) Jan-Christian Dreesen	Vice-Chair	CEO of FC Bayern Munich
(Belgium) Bart Verhaeghe	Vice-Chair	Chairman of Club Brugge KV
(Poland) Dariusz Mioduski	Vice-Chair	Owner & President of Legia Warsaw
(Finland) Aki Riihilahti	Vice-Chair	CEO of HJK Helsinki
(Czech Republic) Martina Pavlová	Vice-Chair	International Relations Manager of AC Sparta Prague
(Spain) Miguel Ángel Gil Marín	Board Member	CEO of Atlético Madrid
(United States) Dan Friedkin	Board Member	Owner & Chairman of AS Roma
(Netherlands) Dennis te Kloese	Board Member	CEO of Feyenoord
(Spain) Ferran Soriano	Board Member	CEO of City Football Group
(Scotland) Peter Lawwell	Independent Board Member	

== Achievements ==
Under a Memorandum of Understanding signed by UEFA in 2008, the European Club Association was recognized as the sole body representing the interests of clubs at European level. As part of the Memorandum of Understanding, UEFA also agreed to distribute every four years an amount from the UEFA European Championship to national associations for them to pass on to their clubs who have contributed to the successful staging of a European Championship.

=== 2012 ===
A renewed Memorandum of Understanding for the period 2012–2018 was signed on 22 March 2012 between ECA and UEFA at the occasion of the XXXVI Ordinary UEFA Congress. The memorandum was signed by ECA Chairman Karl-Heinz Rummenigge and UEFA President Michel Platini.

=== 2023 ===
The most updated Memorandum of Understanding between FIFA and ECA happened at the 29th ECA General Assembly in Budapest, Hungary. It hoped to encourage close collaboration between ECA and FIFA with an extension fulfilled until December 2030. UEFA also signed an agreement that extends their cooperation until 2030.

=== 2024 ===
The most recent Memorandum of Understanding between UEFA and ECA was announced in October during ECA’s 31st General Assembly in Athens, building their long-standing partnership out until 2033. The renewal of the long-term agreement underlines the strengthened relationship between the two organisations who have collaborated on critical issues on European club football in recent years ranging from new competition and revenue distribution structures to Financial Sustainability Regulations

== International Match Calendar ==
The International Match Calendar, a key topic of discussions, makes the release of national team players compulsory for clubs on the dates it highlights. The 2014–18 International Match Calendar is based on a concrete proposal put forward by ECA, and the efforts of a dedicated working group comprising representatives from ECA, European Leagues, FIFPro, and UEFA. The working group's recommendation, acknowledged by FIFA, offers a more balanced system of nine double-headers over two years with no single friendly matches and is beneficial for both clubs and national associations.

== Insurance for players' salaries ==
The Club Protection Program, initially put in place at the expense of UEFA to cover the Euro 2012 in Poland and Ukraine, has since been taken over at FIFA's expense following the approval by the FIFA Congress in Budapest in May 2012. It now covers all clubs that release players for national A-team matches listed on the International Match Calendar, including a FIFA commitment to insure the football tournament of the Olympic Games. The Club Protection Program provides compensation for clubs in the event that national A-team players participating for their national association suffer a temporary total disablement (TTD) as a result of bodily injuries caused by an accident. Players are insured up to a maximum of one year from the day of the excess period (= date of injury + 27 days) and a maximum of €7.5 million.

== Distribution for EURO Benefits ==
As stipulated in the 2008 MoU between ECA and UEFA, the UEFA Executive Committee agreed to set aside provisions of €43.5 million for Euro 2008 in Switzerland and Austria, and €55 million for Euro 2012 in Poland and Ukraine. With the renewal of the MoU, the benefits for clubs releasing players for the Euro 2012 increased to €100 million and were set to increase again to €150 million for Euro 2016. In view of the increased amounts of benefits received by clubs, UEFA and ECA elaborated a new distribution mechanism. The main objective of this distribution mechanism is to have a fair and balanced system, ensure increased benefit for all clubs compared to previous tournaments, and guarantee more clubs are entitled to receive a share of the benefits. For the Euro 2012, the total amount of €100 million was split between the final tournament (60%) and the qualifying phase (40%). This new distribution mechanism led to 578 clubs receiving varying amounts of compensation from UEFA for their part in releasing players for qualifying matches and the final tournament, a significant increase from the 181 clubs who received a share after the UEFA EURO 2008.

== Governance ==
The new MoU granted a greater influence for clubs in the decision-making processes at UEFA. In the future, clubs are guaranteed to have their voices heard and that no decision directly affecting club football will be taken without their prior consent. EFC representatives from the executive board are appointed in both the UEFA Executive Committee, UEFA Club Competitions Committee, UEFA Professional Football Strategy Council and the UEFA Women's Football Committee.

== Educational programmes and initiatives ==
- Academy Management Programme (AMP)
- Club Management Programme (CMP)
- Club Talent & Mentoring Programme (CTMP)
- Knowledge-sharing workshops
- ECA Campus Alumni Association

== Publications ==
=== Community & Social Responsibility Report ===
In September 2011, the European Club Association published its first Community & Social Responsibility (CSR) Report. The aim of this publication was to present the work of European football clubs in the field of CSR. The report is a collection of 54 ECA Member clubs’ CSR projects.

=== EFC Report on Youth Academies in Europe ===
In September 2012, ECA published a Report on Youth Academies in Europe, which acts as a benchmark and provides a comparable perspective that underlines different approaches and philosophies of youth academies across Europe.

=== ECA Study on the Transfer System in Europe ===
In March 2014, ECA published a study on the transfer system, which offers an in-depth overview of all the incoming and outgoing transfer transactions involving European clubs over a two-year period. The ECA Executive Board mandated PricewaterhouseCoopers (PwC) and LIUC University to carry out this work.

=== ECA Women's Club Football Analysis ===
In 2014, ECA published an analysis on Women's Football. This report of the ECA analyses women's football from a club perspective. Topics such as women's club structure, relations with stakeholders as well as key success and constraint factors in the women's game were addressed.

=== ECA Club Management Guide ===
Published in 2015, this publication is a unique mixture of practical and conceptual football club management, focusing on club core activities, environment and strategies. The ECA Club Management Guide is a collation of club representatives’ practical experiences in managing a football club. An extract is available in 9 languages.

== Founding members ==
The following 16 clubs founded the ECA in 2008. Clubs currently being an Ordinary Member Club are marked in italics:

Belgium

- Anderlecht

Croatia

- Dinamo Zagreb

Denmark

- Copenhagen

England

- Chelsea
- Manchester United

France

- Lyon

Germany

- Bayern Munich

Greece

- Olympiacos

Italy

- Juventus
- Milan

Malta

- Birkirkara

Netherlands

- Ajax

Portugal

- Porto

Scotland

- Rangers

Spain

- Barcelona
- Real Madrid

== Current EFC members ==
Country	Ordinary Member	Associated Member
Albania	Laçi, Vllaznia	Kinostudio, Apolonia, Kukësi, Partizani, Erzeni, Tirana
Andorra	Inter Club d'Escaldes	CE Carroi, Atlètic Amèrica, CF Esperança, FC Ordino, FC Santa Coloma, FS La Massana, Pas de la Casa, UE Sant Julià, UE Santa Coloma
Armenia	Ararat-Armenia	Alashkert, Ararat, Gandzasar, FC Noah, FC Pyunik, FC Shirak, FC Urartu, FC West Armenia, FC Van, Syunik
Austria	FC Salzburg, LASK, SK Sturm Graz, SKN St. Pölten Frauen, Wolfsberger AC	Admira Wacker, Blau-Weiss Linz, FK Austria Wien, GAK 1902, SCR Altach, SK Austria Klagenfurt, SK Rapid, SV Oberbank Ried
Azerbaijan	Qarabağ	Araz-Naxçıvan, Sabail, Gabala, İmişli, Kəpəz, Karvan-Yevlax, Neftçi PFK, Zirə, Sabah, Sumqayıt, Turan Tovuz
Belarus	BATE Borisov, FC Minsk	Arsenal Dzerzhinsk, Belshina, Dinamo Minsk, Dnepr Mogilev, Dynamo Brest, Energetik-BSU Minsk, FC Gomel, Isloch, Maxline Vitebsk, Neman Grodno, Shakhtyor Soligorsk, FC Smorgon, TORPEDO-BELAZ, FC Vitebsk, SFC Slutsk, SKA-1938, WFC ABFF U-19, DUSSH-PolesSu
Belgium	Club Brugge, KAA Gent, Royal Antwerp, RSC Anderlecht	Cercle Brugge, FC Dender, KAS Eupen, K.R.C. Genk, K.V. Kortrijk, K.V. Mechelen, K.V.C. Westerlo, Oud-Heverlee Leuven, R. Standard de Liège, Royal Charleroi, RWDM Brussels, Sint-Truidense
Bosnia and Herzegovina	FK Sarajevo, HŠK Zrinjski	Borac Banja Luka, Igman Konjic, Sloga Doboj, FK Tuzla City, Velež Mostar, Željezničar, FK Zvijezda 09, HŠK Posušje, NK GOŠK Gabela, NK Široki Brijeg, ŽF/NK Emina, ZFK Leotar Trebinje
Bulgaria	PFC CSKA Sofia, PFC Ludogorets 1945	CSKA 1948 Sofia, FC Dobrudja 1919, FC Dunav Ruse, FC Etar VT, FC Hebar Pazardzhik, FC Lokomotiv Sofia 1929, FC NSA, FC Sevlievo Ladies, FC Spartak Varna, FC Sportika Blagoevgrad, Paldin Plovdiv, FK Svetkavitsa Gradezhnitsa, Botev Vratsa, Arda Kardzhali, PFC Beroe Stara Zagora, Botev Plovdiv, PFC Cherno More Varna, PFC Levski Sofia, PFC Lokomotiv Plovdiv, PFC Septemvri Sofia, PFC Slavia Sofia, Pirin Blagoevgrad
Croatia	GNK Dinamo Zagreb, HNK Rijeka	HNK Gorica, HNK Hajduk Split, NK Istra 1961, NK Osijek, NK Rudeš, NK Slaven Belupo, NK Varaždin, ŽNK Agram, ŽNK Dinamo Zagreb, ŽNK Donat, ŽNK Međimurje, ŽNK Split
Cyprus	APOEL, Apollon Limassol, Omonoia	AEK Larnaca, AEL Limassol, AEZ Zakakiou, Akritas Chlorakas, Anorthosis Famagusta, Aris Limassol, Chrysomilia Agios Amvrosios Kyrenia, Ethnikos Achnas, Karmiotissa, Lakatamia FC, Lefkothea, Nea Salamis, Olympiakos Nicosia, Omonia Aradippou, Omonia 29M, Pafos FC
Czech Republic	AC Sparta Praha, SK Slavia Praha	Bohemians 1905, FC Baník Ostrava, FC Hradec Králové, 1. FC Slovácko, FC Slovan Liberec, FC Viktoria Plzeň, FC Zlín, FK Jablonec, FK Mladá Boleslav, FK Pardubice, FK Teplice, MFK Karviná, SK České Budějovice, SK Sigma Olomouc
Denmark	Brøndby IF, FC Copenhagen, FC Midtjylland, Fortuna Hjørring	Aalborg BK, AC Horsens, AGF Aarhus, B.93, Esbjerg fB, FC Nordsjælland, HB Køge Women, Odense BK, Silkeborg IF
England	Arsenal, Chelsea, Liverpool, Manchester City, Manchester United, Tottenham Hotspur, West Ham United	AFC Bournemouth, Aston Villa, Brentford, Brighton & Hove Albion, Everton, Fulham, Ipswich Town, Leeds United, Leicester City, London City Lionesses, Newcastle United, Nottingham Forest, Sunderland
Estonia	FC Flora	FC Ararat Tallinn, FC Kuressaare, FC Nõmme United, FCI Levadia, Harju JK Laagri, JK Narva Trans, JK Tallinna Kalev, JK Tammeka Tartu, Nõmme Kalju, Paide Linnameeskond, Pärnu JK Vaprus
Faroe Islands	KÍ Klaksvík	B36 Tórshavn, B68 Toftir, EB/Streymur, FC Hoyvík, HB Tórshavn, NSÍ Runavík, 07 Vestur, Víkingur
Finland	HJK Helsinki	AC Oulu, Ekenäs IF, FC Haka, FC Honka, FC Inter Turku, FC Lahti, IF Gnistan, IFK Mariehamn, Ilves Tampere, KuPS Kuopio, SJK Seinäjoki, VPS Vaasa
France	LOSC Lille, Olympique de Marseille, Olympique Lyonnais, Paris Saint-Germain, Stade Rennais	AJ Auxerre, Angers SCO, AS Monaco, AS Saint-Étienne, Clermont Foot, Dijon FCO, En Avant de Guingamp, ESTAC Troyes, FC Girondins de Bordeaux, FC Lorient, FC Metz, FC Nantes, Fleury 91 Féminines, Montpellier Hérault SC, OGC Nice, Paris FC, Racing Club de Strasbourg Alsace, RC Lens, Stade Brestois 29, Stade de Reims, Toulouse FC
Georgia	FC Dinamo Tbilisi	Chikhura Sachkhere, FC Dila Gori, FC Dinamo Batoumi, FC Gagra, FC Iberia 1999, FC Kakheti Telavi, FC Samtredia, FC Torpedo Kutaisi, FC Tskaltubo Samgurali, Kvartali FC, Lanchkhuti, W.F.C. Nike Lusso
Germany	Bayer 04 Leverkusen, Borussia Dortmund, Eintracht Frankfurt, FC Bayern München, RB Leipzig, TSG 1899 Hoffenheim, VfL Wolfsburg	Borussia VfL 1900 Mönchengladbach, FC Augsburg, 1. FC Heidenheim, 1. FC Köln, 1. FC Nürnberg, FC Schalke 04, 1. FC Union Berlin, 1. FSV Mainz 05, Hamburger SV, Hertha BSC, SC Freiburg, SGS Essen, SV Darmstadt 98, SV Werder Bremen, VfB Stuttgart, VfL Bochum
Gibraltar	Lincoln Red Imps	College 1975, Europa, Europa Point, FC Hound Dogs, FC Magpies, Gibraltar Wave, Glacis United, Hercules FC, Lions Gibraltar, Lynx, Manchester 1962, Mons Calpe, St Joseph's
Greece	Olympiacos, PAOK	AEK Athens, Aris, AS Olimpiada Imittou, Asteras Tripolis, Athens Kallithea F.C., Atromitos, Kifisia, Larissa Women, Levadiakos, Nees Atromitou, OFI Crete, Panathinaikos, Panetolikos, Panserraikos, PAS Giannina, PAS Lamia, Volos NFC
Hungary	Fehérvár FC, Ferencvárosi TC	Budapest Honvéd FC, Debreceni VSC, Gyori ETO FC, Kisvárda FC, MTK Budapest FC, Puskás Akadémia FC, Újpest FC, ZTE FC
Iceland	Breidablik	FH Hafnarfjördur, Fram Reykjavik FC, Fylkir, HK Kopavogs, ÍA, ÍBV, KA Akureyri, Keflavík, KR Reykjavík, Stjarnan, Þór/KA, Þróttur Reykjavík, Ungmennafélagið Afturelding, Valur, Vestri, Víkingur Reykjavík
Ireland	Shamrock Rovers	Cork City, Derry City, DLR Waves, Drogheda United, Dundalk, Galway United, Peamount United, Saint Patrick's Athletic, Shelbourne, Sligo Rovers, Waterford
Israel	Hapoel Beer-Sheva, Maccabi Tel-Aviv	ASA Tel Aviv University, Beitar Jerusalem, Bnei Sakhnin, Bnei Yehuda Tel-Aviv, Bnot Netanya, F.C. Ashdod, Hapoel Hadera, Hapoel Haifa, Hapoel Jerusalem, Hapoel Petah Tikva, Hapoel Tel-Aviv, Ironi Tiberias, Kiryat Gat W.F.C., Maccabi Bnei Reineh, Maccabi Haifa, Maccabi Kishronot Hadera, Maccabi Petah Tikva, WFC Ramat Hasharon, Hapoel Ra'anana A.F.C.
Italy	A.C. Milan, ACF Fiorentina, AS Roma, Atalanta BC, FC Internazionale Milano, Juventus, S.S. Lazio, SSC Napoli	Bologna, Cagliari Calcio, Como 1907, Empoli FC, FC Como Women, Frosinone Calcio, Genoa CFC, Hellas Verona, Monza, Parma Calcio 1913, Pisa SC, Torino FC, UC Sampdoria, Udinese Calcio, US Cremonese, US Lecce, US Salernitana 1919, US Sassuolo, Venezia FC
Kazakhstan	FC Astana, BIIK Shymkent	FC Aktobe, FC Akzhayik, FC Kairat, FC Okzhetpes, FC Ordabasy, FC Shakhter Karagandy, FC Yelimay
Kosovo	FC Drita	FC Ballkani, FC Ferizaj, KF Malisheva, FC Prishtina, FC Suhareka, KF Dukagjini, KF Feronikeli, KF Liria, KF Llapi, KF Prishtina e Re, KFF 16 Qershori, KFF Bazeli, KFF Llapi, KFF Mitrovica, KFF Presingu, KFF Ulpiana, KFV Prishtina, SC Gjilani, WFC Hajvalia
Latvia	Riga FC	FK Auda, FK Liepāja, Valmiera FC
Liechtenstein	Vaduz	
Lithuania	FK Žalgiris	Džiugas Telsiai, FC Gintra, DFK Dainava, FK Kauno Žalgiris, FK Panevėžys, FK Riteriai, FK Sūduva, FK Utenis Utena
Luxembourg	F91 Diddeleng	AS Jeunesse Esch, Atert Bissen, CS Fola Esch, Entente Hosingen Norden Women, Entente Wormeldange WMG, FC Differdange 03, FC Jeunesse Canach, FC Jeunesse Jonglënster, FC Mamer 32, FC Mondercange, FC Progrès Niederkorn, FC Rodange 91, FC Schifflange 95, FC Swift Hesperange, FC UNA Strassen, FC Victoria Rosport, FC Wiltz 71, Marisca Mersch, Racing FC Union Luxembourg, SC Bettembourg, UN Käerjéng 97, Union Titus Pétange, US Hostert, US Mondorf-les-Bains
Malta	Hibernians	Balzan, Birkirkara, Floriana, Gzira United, Hamrun Spartans, Mosta, Sliema Wanderers, Swieqi United, Valletta, Zabbar St Patrick
Moldova	Sheriff Tiraspol	Dacia-Buiucani, FC Balti, FC Florești, Milsami Orhei, Petrocub-Hincesti, Zimbru Chisinau
Montenegro	Budućnost Podgorica	Mladost Donja Gorica, ŽFK Breznica, FK Dečić, FK Jedinstvo Bijelo Polje, FK Jezero, FK Mornar, FK Otrant Olympic, FK Rudar Pljevlja, FK Sutjeska, FK Zeta, OFK Petrovac, OFK Titograd, FK Zora
Netherlands	AFC Ajax, AZ Alkmaar, FC Twente, Feyenoord, PSV Eindhoven	Almere City FC, Excelsior Rotterdam, FC Utrecht, Go Ahead Eagles, Hera United, Heracles Almelo, NEC Nijmegen, PEC Zwolle, RKC Waalwijk, SC Fortuna Sittard, SC Heerenveen, SC Telstar VVNH, Sparta Rotterdam
North Macedonia	KF Shkëndija	AP Brera Strumica, KF Bashkimi 1947, KF Shkupi, FC Struga, KF Arsimi, FK Bregalnica Stip, FK Gostivar, FK Makedonija GP Skopje, FK Rabotnicki, FK Sileks Kratovo, GFK Tikvesh, FK Vardar, FK Voska Sport, Football Club Pelister Bitola, ŽFK Kamenica Sasa, ŽFK Tiverija, ŽFK Cevitana, ŽFK Istatov, ŽFK Ljuboten, ŽFK Rečica
Northern Ireland	Linfield	Ballymena United, Bangor, Cliftonville, Coleraine, Crusaders, Dungannon Swifts, Glenavon, Glentoran, Larne
Norway	FK Bodø/Glimt, Lillestrøm SK, Molde FK, Rosenborg BK, Vålerenga Fotball	Bryne FK, FK Haugesund, Fredrikstad FK, Kolbotn, Kristiansund BK, Odds BK, Røa IL, Sandefjord Fotball, SK Brann, Stabæk Fotball, Strømsgodset, Tromsø IL, Viking FK
Poland	KKS Lech Poznań, Legia Warszawa	AP Orlen Gdansk, GKS Górnik Leczna, Jagiellonia Białystok, Korona Kielce, KS Cracovia SA, KS Lechia Gdańsk, MKS Pogoń Szczecin, MKS Puszcza Niepolomice, Radomiak Radom, Raków Czestochowa, RTS Widzew Łódź, Warta Poznań, Wisła Kraków, WKS Śląsk Wrocław
Portugal	FC Porto, SC Braga, SL Benfica, Sporting Clube de Portugal	AVS Futebol SAD, Boavista, Casa Pia, CF Estrela da Amadora, CS Marítimo, Estoril Praia, FC Famalicao, FC Vizela, Gil Vicente, Rio Ave, SC Farense, SCU Torreense, Valadares Gaia, Vitória SC
Romania	CFR 1907 Cluj, FCSB	AFK Csikszereda Miercurea Ciuc, CS Atletic Olimpia Gherla, CSM Politehnica Iași, FC Botosani, FC Dinamo Bucureşti, FC Otelul Galati, FC Petrolul Ploiesti, FC Rapid București, FC Universitatea Cluj, FC Voluntari, FCV Farul Constanţa
~~Russia~~	Lokomotiv Moscow, Zenit Saint Petersburg	CSKA Moscow, Krasnodar, Spartak Moscow
San Marino	SP Tre Penne	AC Juvenes-Dogana, A.C. Libertas, F.C. Fiorentino, La Fiorita 1967, S.C. Faetano, S.P. Cailungo, S.P. Tre Fiori, S.S. Cosmos, SS Folgore, S.S. Murata, S.S. San Giovanni, S.S. Virtus
Scotland	Aberdeen, Celtic, Glasgow City, Rangers	Dundee, Dundee United, Falkirk Football Club, Hamilton Academical WFC, Heart of Midlothian, Hibernian, Kilmarnock, Livingston, Montrose W.F.C., Motherwell, Partick Thistle Women's Football Club, Ross County, Spartans, St Johnstone, St Mirren Football Club
Serbia	FK Crvena Zvezda, FK Čukarički, FK Partizan, ŽFK Spartak Subotica	FK IMT, FK Javor-Matis, FK Jedinstvo Ub, FK Mladost Lučani, FK Napredak, FK Novi Pazar, FK Radnički Niš, FK Radnik Surdulica, FK Spartak Subotica, FK Tekstilac Odžaci, FK Vojvodina, FK Voždovac, FK Železničar Pančevo, OFK Beograd, TSC Backa Topola, ZFK Crvena Zvezda, ŽFK Mašinac, ŽFK Milutniac 2023 Zemun, ŽFK Sloga Zemun, ŽFK TSC Kanjiža
Slovakia	FC DAC 1904 Dunajská Streda, ŠK Slovan Bratislava	AS Trenčín, FC Spartak Trnava, FC ViOn Zlaté Moravce, MFK Ružomberok, MŠK Žilina
Slovenia	NK Maribor, NŠ Mura	FC Koper, NK Aluminij, NK Bravo, NK Celje, NK Domžale, NK Gazon, NK Nafta 1903, NK Olimpija Ljubljana, NK Radomlje, Rogaska, ŽNK Cerklje, ŽNK Olimpija Ljubljana, ŽNK Primorje Ajdovščina
Spain	Club Atlético de Madrid, FC Barcelona, Real Betis, Real Sociedad, Sevilla FC, Villarreal CF	Athletic Club, FC Badalona Women, Getafe CF, Girona FC, Levante UD, Madrid CFF, RC Celta de Vigo, RCD Espanyol, Real Club Deportivo de La Coruña, Real Zaragoza, UD Tenerife, Valencia CF
Sweden	BK Häcken, Djurgårdens IF, FC Rosengård, Malmö FF	AIK, GAIS, Hammarby Fotboll, IF Brommapojkarna, IF Elfsborg, IFK Göteborg, IFK Norrköping, Kristianstads DFF, Linköpings FC, Mjällby AIF, Vittsjö GIK
Switzerland	BSC Young Boys, FC Basel, FC Lugano, FC Zürich, Servette FC	FC Aarau Frauen, FC Lausanne-Sport, FC Luzern, FC Rapperswil-Jona, FC Sion, FC St. Gallen, FC Stade-Lausanne-Ouchy, FC Thun, Frauenteam Thun Berner-Oberland, Grasshopper Club Zürich, Yverdon Sport FC
Turkey	Fenerbahçe, Galatasaray, İstanbul Başakşehir	ABB Fomget SK, Adana Demirspor, Alanyaspor, ALG Spor, Amed Sportif Faaliyeteler Kulubu, Antalyaspor, Beşiktaş, Beylerbeyispor, Bodrum FK, Eyüpspor, Fatih Karagümrük AŞ, Fatih Vatan Spor, Gaziantep Futbol Kulübü AŞ, Göztepe, Hatayspor, Kasımpaşa, Kayserispor, Konyaspor, MKE Ankaragücü, Pendikspor, Rizespor, Samsunspor, Sivasspor, Trabzonspor
Ukraine	FC Dynamo Kyiv, Shakhtar Donetsk, Vorskla Poltava, Zorya Luhansk	FC Chornomorets Odesa, FC Karpaty Lviv, Kryvbas Kryvyi Rih, FC Metalist 1925 Kharkiv, FC Oleksandriya, NK Veres Rivne, Polissya Zhytomyr
Wales	The New Saints	Cardiff City, Cardiff Metropolitan University, Connah's Quay Nomads, Llanelli Town, Penybont, Wrexham

== See also ==
- European Multisport Club Association
- European Leagues
- Proposals for a European Super League in association football – A project for a sole pan-European Football League in which the European Club Association has been involved
