= Bernd Reichart =

German businessman (born 1974)

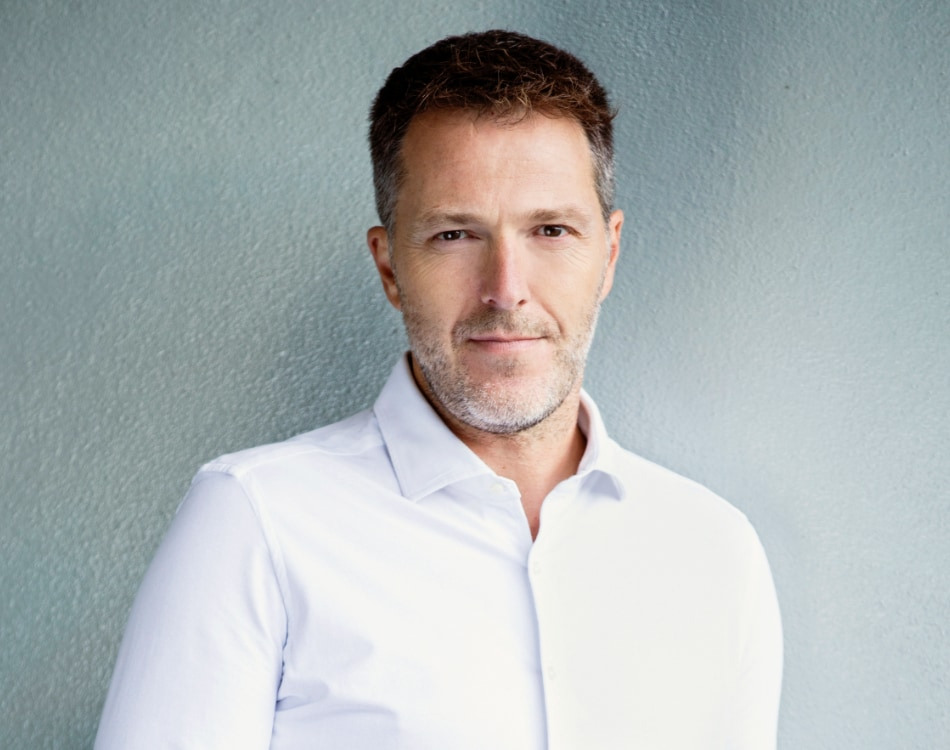
- Reichart in 2019
- Born: 12 March 1974 (age 52); Scheidegg, Bavaria, West Germany
- Education: University of Konstanz; University of Salamanca (1997–1998); University of North Carolina at Asheville (1998–1999)
- Occupation: Business Executive
- Years active: 2003–present
- Known for: Head of Business Operations, Real Madrid

Bernd Reichart (born 12 March 1974) is a German businessman, who is currently the Head of Business Operations of La Liga club Real Madrid. He previously was the chief executive officer (CEO) of sports management company A22 Sports Management S.L., which is behind the proposed football competition, the European Super League. he also the chief executive officer (CEO) of RTL Deutschland from 2019 until 2021 and the Managing Director of the German TV channel VOX. Earlier in his career, he worked in Spain as an executive for Antena 3.

He has lived in Spain since 2003.

== Early life and education ==
Reichart was born on 12 March 1974 in Scheidegg, a town in the German state of Bavaria. He studied sports science and English in University of Konstanz in Germany, University of Salamanca in Spain, and University of North Carolina at Asheville in the United States.

== Career ==
After graduating, Reichart began working in Hamburg at UFA Sports. He moved to Madrid, where he worked as marketing manager for Sportfive.

Reichart then spent almost several years working for media company Antena 3 Televisión (now Atresmedia), where he firstwas responsible for financial communication of the listed company. In July 2007, he was appointed to the management board of Antena 3, where he started in investor relations and eventually became managing director, in charge of five free-to-air channels, including NEOX, NOVA, and NITRO.

In February 2013, Reichart finally returned to Germany. He took over the managing director of VOX, he was also a member of the management of the RTL Deutschland media group.

In January 2019, Reichart was appointed to serve as CEO for media company RTL Deutschland. he also moved into the extended management circle of the RTL Group. In addition, he sat on the same committee at Bertelsmann. In 2021, he also took over the chairmanship of the Bertelsmann Content Alliance. This is coordinated by Bertelsmann's content business. In August 2021, it was announced that Reichart was leaving the media group RTL.

In October 2022, Reichart became CEO of A22 Sports Management, the Spain-based company that "sponsor[s]" and "assist[s]" in "the creation of the European Super League, announced it would be relaunching the competition after they failed to bring the project in April 2021. The same day, Reichart claimed the Super League "would be relaunched within three years." He added that European football is "becoming unsustainable" under the "current system." After claiming that "European club-football is not living up to its potential", he stated that "permanent membership is off the table" and, instead, the "stakeholders" should discuss "an open competition based on sporting merit. With the support of both El Clásico teams Real Madrid and Barcelona is trying to establish a new super league in European football. After initial difficulties, the plans were changed and concretized in 2023. This is intended to improve the competitiveness of professional football."

== Personal life ==
Reichart is fluent in Spanish.
