= Lennart Johansson =

Swedish football administrator (1929–2019)

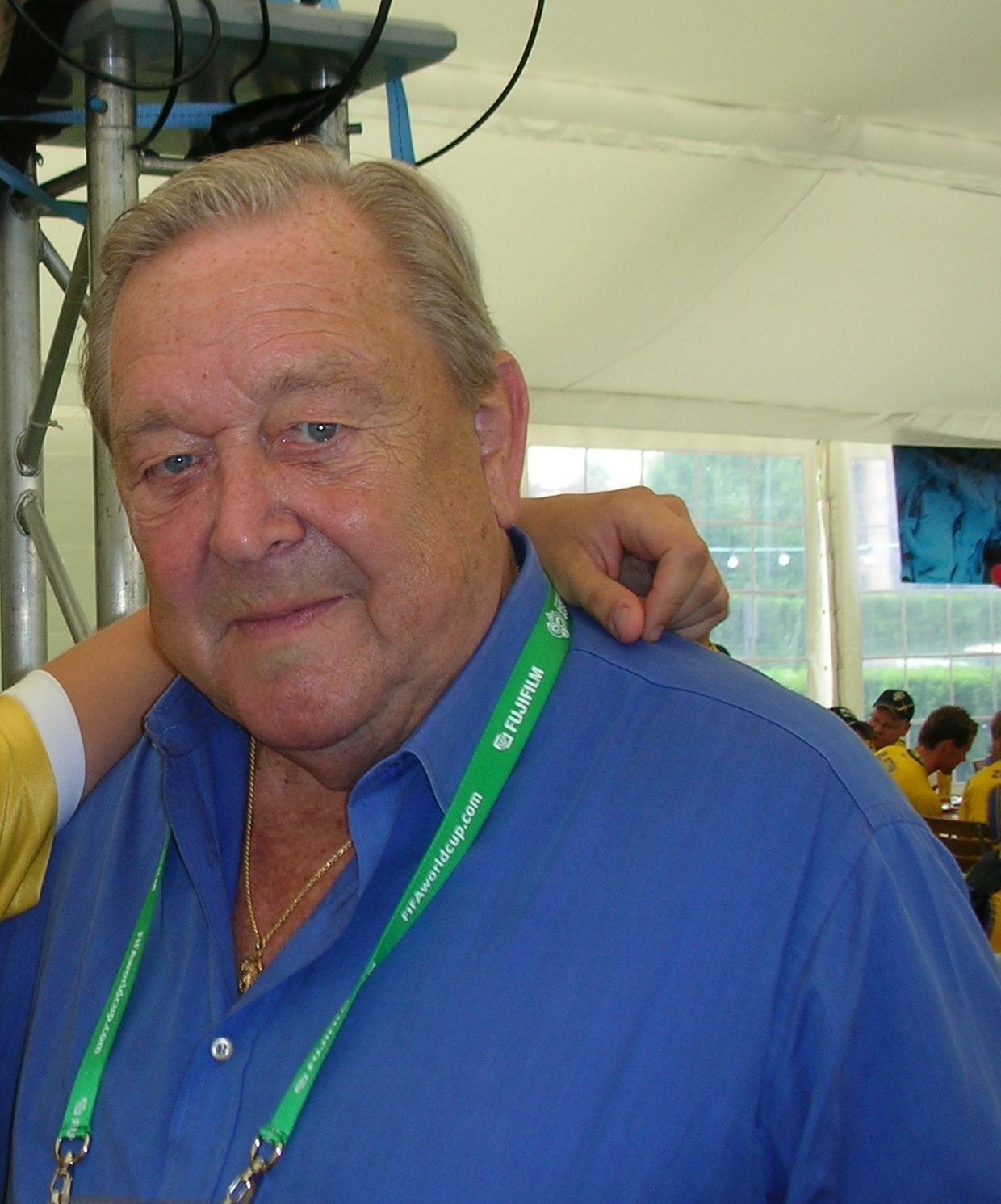
- Johansson in 2006

Honorary President of UEFA
- In office 26 January 2007 – 4 June 2019
- President: Michel Platini; Ángel María Villar (acting); Aleksander Čeferin

5th President of UEFA
- In office 19 April 1990 – 26 January 2007
- Preceded by: Jacques Georges
- Succeeded by: Michel Platini

Personal details
- Born: Nils Lennart Johansson; 5 November 1929 Stockholm, Sweden
- Died: 4 June 2019 (aged 89) Stockholm, Sweden
- Children: 5
- Occupation: Football administrator

Nils Lennart Johansson (5 November 1929 – 4 June 2019) was a Swedish sports official who served as the fifth and, to date, longest-serving president of UEFA, the Union of European Football Associations. He served in the position from his election at the UEFA Congress in 1990 until 2007. In June 1998, he contested the FIFA presidential election against Sepp Blatter, losing by 111 votes to 80.

== Early life ==
Johansson grew up in Åkeshov, a then newly built suburb west of Stockholm with his parents, his father Erik Hilmer Johansson (1884–1963) and mother Anna-Maria Johansson (née Pettersson 1886–1964). As a child, he used to bike from his home to Råsunda Stadium to watch AIK matches along with his brothers. He also played football for his local team Åkeshov.

== Career ==
Johansson worked at Forbo Forshaga (now Forbo Flooring) from 1950 to 1990, starting as an errand-boy and in the end becoming the company's CEO and chairman. From 1984, he was a president of the board of Tipstjänst and Operakällaren; he was also chairman and president of AIK between 1967 and 1980. Johansson was a lifelong supporter of AIK.

Between 1985 and 1990, Johansson was the president of the Swedish Football Association. In 1990, he was voted UEFA President at the UEFA Congress in Malta. Johansson helped found the UEFA Champions League, replacing the European Cup. Johansson supported Sweden's bid to host UEFA Euro 1992, and England's bid to host UEFA Euro 1996. During Johansson's presidency, the UEFA headquarters were also moved from Bern to Nyon.

In June 1998, Johansson contested Sepp Blatter to become FIFA President; he lost by 111 votes to 80. It was alleged that Blatter's victory had been helped by bribery involving João Havelange. After the election, Johansson accused Blatter of financial mismanagement, and voted for Issa Hayatou rather than Blatter at the 2002 FIFA presidency election.

In 2007, Johansson was succeeded as UEFA president by Michel Platini. In October 2007, he was appointed chairman of a committee for bringing bandy into the Olympic programme.

In 2001, the trophy given to the winning team of Swedish league Allsvenskan was renamed after Johansson: Lennart Johanssons Pokal. Prior to this the trophy had been named after Clarence von Rosen.

== Awards and honours ==
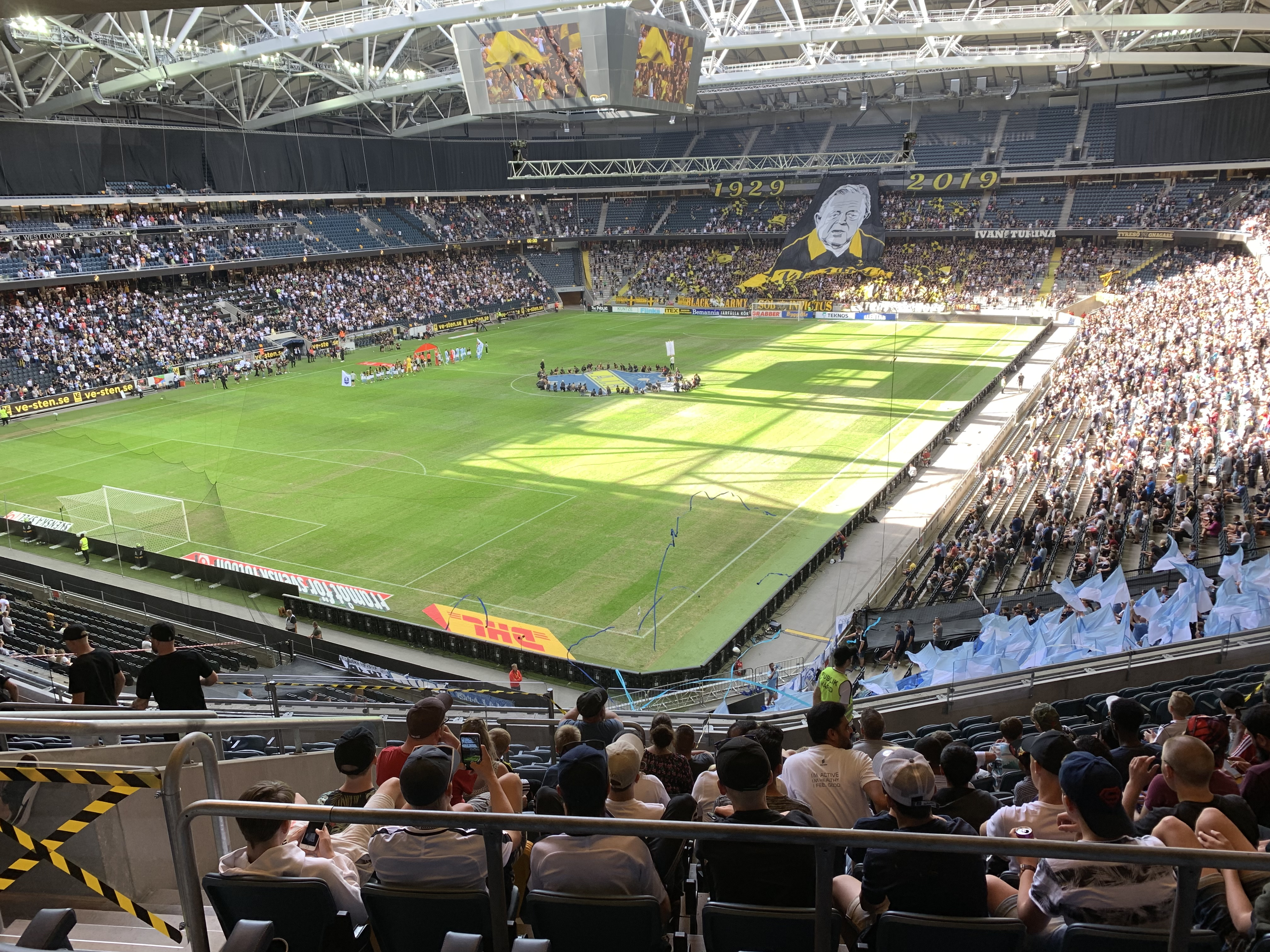
Tribute to Johansson at Friends Arena in June 2019

- (Sweden) Illis quorum, 12th size (22 February 2005)
- Great Cross of Merit of the Order of Merit of the Federal Republic of Germany (2005)
- (South Africa) Supreme Companion of the Order of the Companions of O. R. Tambo (29 October 2004)
- (Hungary) Commander's Cross of the Hungarian Order of Merit (22 March 2006)
- (Iceland) Knight's Cross of the Order of the Falcon (18 November 1997)
- (Romania) Officer of the National Order of Merit (August 2002)
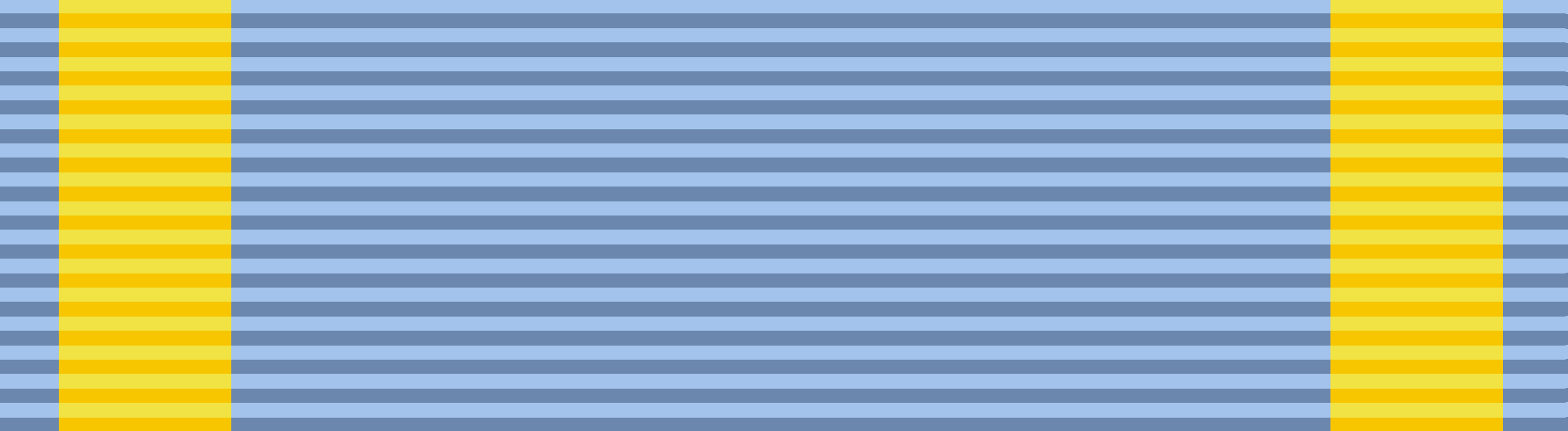
- (Ukraine) Third Class of the Order of Prince Yaroslav the Wise
- (Ukraine) First Class of the Order of Merit
- (Ukraine) Third Class of the Order of Merit
- (Kazakhstan) Second Class of the Order of Friendship (2005)
- (Russia) Order of Friendship
- CAF's Order of Merit
- Unidentified Red Cross Medal (Note: See closer look of the unidentified Red Cross medal here.)

== Personal life ==
Johansson was married twice and had five children. He was married to his first wife, Anna-Stina Eriksson (1922–2005), from 1953 to 1980, with whom he had two daughters. His second marriage was with Lola Sidenvall (1929–2017). In December 2017, he became a widower after his wife Lola died.

In 2008, he suffered a severe cerebral haemorrhage, and after that his physical health began to fail. Johansson died on 4 June 2019, aged 89.

== Notes ==
Civic offices
| Preceded by Gösta Ellhammar | Chairman of AIK; 1967–1980 | Succeeded by Carl Erik Hedlund |
| Preceded by Gunnar Ericsson | Chairman of the Swedish Football Association; 1985–1990 | Succeeded by Lars-Åke Lagrell |
| Preceded by Jacques Georges | President of UEFA; 1990–2007 | Succeeded by Michel Platini |
