= Theodore Theodoridis =

Greek football official (born 1965)

- Θεόδωρος Θεοδωρίδης

UEFA General Secretary
- Incumbent
- Assumed office September 2016; Acting: March – September 2016
- Preceded by: Gianni Infantino

Personal details
- Born: 1 August 1965 (age 61) Athens, Greece
- Children: Ioannis Theodoridis and Savvas theodoridis

Theodore Theodoridis (Greek: Θεόδωρος Θεοδωρίδης; born 1 August 1965) is a Greek football official.

== Biography ==
In March 2016, Theodoridis was appointed interim general secretary of UEFA, as a replacement for Gianni Infantino. This became permanent that September, when current president Aleksander Čeferin was elected. Before becoming general secretary, he was UEFA's deputy general secretary.

Prior to joining UEFA, Theodoridis was a board member of the Hellenic Football Federation (HFF).

Sporting positions
Preceded by Gianni Infantino	UEFA General Secretary; 2016–present	Succeeded by Incumbent
