= Sándor Barcs =

Hungarian journalist and politician (1912–2010)

Member of the National Assembly
- In office 16 September 1947 – 1 May 1990

Vice President of UEFA
- In office 17 April 1962 – 7 July 1972
- In office 15 March 1973 – 22 April 1978

Acting President of UEFA
- In office 7 July 1972 – 15 March 1973
- Preceded by: Gustav Wiederkehr
- Succeeded by: Artemio Franchi

Personal details
- Born: Bartsch Sándor; 10 November 1912 Szeged, Austria-Hungary (now Hungary)
- Died: 7 January 2010 (aged 97) Budapest, Hungary
- Party: FKGP (1943–49); MSZMP (1964–89)
- Spouse(s): Molnár Mária (1945-?), Kenéz Márta (1962-?), Szabó Magdolna (1970-?)
- Profession: journalist, politician, sports officer

Sándor Barcs (10 November 1912 – 7 January 2010) was a Hungarian journalist, politician, sports executive and amateur footballer. He was the Acting President of UEFA between July 1972 and March 1973.

In 2003, Sándor Dorogi, on behalf of the MTI news agency, presented him with the "Golden Ring" award, which met with a divided response in journalistic circles due to the honoree's not uncontroversial political past (he was, among other things, a presiding judge at the show trial and co-signer of the death sentence against László Rajk).

Sporting positions
Preceded by Gyula Prém	President of the Hungarian Olympic Committee alongside Alajos Jámbor; 1947–1948	Succeeded by Gusztáv Sebes; Zsigmond Ábrai
Preceded by István Ries	President of the Hungarian Football Federation; 1950–1963	Succeeded by Gyula Hegyi
Preceded by Gustav Wiederkehr	Acting President of UEFA; 1972–1973	Succeeded by Artemio Franchi
