= UEFA =

International governing body for association football in Europe

- Union of European Football Associations

- Abbreviation: UEFA
- Formation: 15 June 1954; 72 years ago
- Founded at: Basel, Switzerland
- Type: Football organisation
- Headquarters: Nyon, Switzerland
- Coordinates: 46°22′15″N 6°13′52″E
- Region served: Europe (Note: Also includes the transcontinental countries of Turkey, Azerbaijan, Georgia and Kazakhstan, as well as the West Asian countries of Cyprus, Armenia and Israel.)
- Members: 55 full member associations
- Official languages: English; French; German (other main but not official: Italian, Russian, Portuguese, Spanish)
- President: Aleksander Čeferin
- First vice-president: Gabriele Gravina
- Vice-presidents: Hans-Joachim Watzke; Jesper Møller Christensen; Laura McAllister; Armand Duka
- General secretary: Theodore Theodoridis
- Main organ: UEFA Congress
- Parent organisation: FIFA
- Website: uefa.com

The Union of European Football Associations (UEFA) (Note: English pronunciation: /juːˈeɪfə/ yoo-AY-fə French: Union des associations européennes de football (Note: French pronunciation: [ynjɔ̃ dez‿asɔsjɑsjɔ̃ øʁɔpeɛn də futbol].) German: Union der europäischen Fußballverbände (Note: German pronunciation: [uˈni̯oːn deːɐ̯ ʔɔʏʁoˈpɛːɪʃn̩ ˈfuːsbalfɐˌbɛndə].)) is the governing body of football in Europe and one of FIFA's six continental confederations for association football consisting of 55 national associations. It runs national and club competitions for men and women, such as the Champions League, the Women's Champions League, the European Championship, the Women's European Championship, and the Nations League.

== History and membership ==
UEFA was officially inaugurated on 15 June 1954 in Basel, Switzerland, after consultation between the Italian, French, and Belgian associations. At the founding meeting, 25 members were present. However, six other associations which were not present were still recognised as founding members, bringing the total of founding associations to 31. UEFA grew to more than 50 members by the mid-1990s, as new associations were born out of the fragmentation of the Soviet Union, Yugoslavia and Czechoslovakia into their constituent states. UEFA's main headquarters after its foundation were located in Paris, but moved to Bern in 1960. Finally, they moved to Nyon, Switzerland, in 1995, opening the organisation's current headquarters in 1999.

=== Current members ===
UEFA membership coincides for the most part with recognition as a sovereign country in Europe (48 out of 55 members are sovereign UN member states), although there are some exceptions. One UN member state (Monaco) and one UN General Assembly non-member observer state (Vatican City) are not members. Some UEFA members are not sovereign states, but form part of a larger recognised sovereign state in the context of international law. These include England, Northern Ireland, Scotland, and Wales (UK constituent countries); Gibraltar (UK overseas territory); Faroe Islands (Danish Realm); and Kosovo (state with limited recognition). In the context of these countries, sports governance tends to be carried out at the territorial level coterminous with the UEFA member entity. However, UEFA has declined membership to other polities like Jersey.

Some UEFA members are transcontinental states (Azerbaijan, Georgia, Kazakhstan, Russia, and Turkey), and others are considered part of Europe both culturally and politically (Turkey, Cyprus, and Armenia). Countries which had been members of the Asian Football Confederation (AFC) were also admitted to the European Football Association, such as Israel (because it had been banned from the AFC group in 1974) and Kazakhstan. Involving clubs, some UEFA member associations allow teams from outside their association's main territory to take part in their "domestic" competition, for example, AS Monaco in the French League, various Welsh clubs are in the English leagues, English-based The New Saints in the Welsh League, or Derry City, situated in Northern Ireland, plays in the Ireland-based League of Ireland.

On 28 February 2022, due to the 2022 Russian invasion of Ukraine and in accordance with a recommendation by the International Olympic Committee (IOC), UEFA suspended the participation of Russia. The Russian Football Union unsuccessfully appealed the UEFA ban to the Court of Arbitration for Sport, which upheld the ban. On 26 September 2023 the ban was lifted for the Russia U-17 team enabling them to complete in the 2024 Euro U-17 with UEFA saying "by banning children from our competitions, we not only fail to recognise and uphold a fundamental right for their holistic development but we directly discriminate against them". The lifting of the ban also applied to all teams, men and women, of underage players. This was rejected by the FAs of Ukraine, England, and Sweden, with all three threatening to boycott matches against Russia. UEFA later axed the plan.

== Executive committee ==
The UEFA executive committee comprises the UEFA president and up to 19 other members: 16 elected by the UEFA Congress (including at least two female members), two by European Football Clubs and one by the European Leagues. All members hold the same rights and duties

President

- (Slovenia) Aleksander Čeferin

Vice-presidents

- (Albania) Armand Duka
- (Germany) Hans-Joachim Watzke
- (Denmark) Jesper Møller
- (Italy) Gabriele Gravina, first vice-president
- (Wales) Laura McAllister

General secretary

- (Greece) Theodore Theodoridis

FIFA Council – European members

- (Hungary) Sándor Csányi, UEFA treasurer
- (England) Debbie Hewitt, FIFA vice-president
- (Belgium) Pascale Van Damme
- (Montenegro) Dejan Savićević
- (Cyprus) Giorgos Koumas
- (Romania) Răzvan Burleanu
- (Germany) Bernd Neuendorf

Members

- (Czech Republic) Petr Fousek
- (France) Philippe Diallo
- (Georgia (country)) Levan Kobiashvili
- (Norway) Lise Klaveness
- (Croatia) Marijan Kustić
- (Finland) Ari Lahti
- (Spain) Rafael Louzán
- (Armenia) Armen Melikbekyan
- (Netherlands) Frank Paauw
- (Israel) Moshe Zuares
- (Estonia) Aivar Pohlak
- (Switzerland) Claudius Schäfer, EL representative
- (Spain) Miguel Ángel Gil Marín, EFC representative
- (Qatar) Nasser Al-Khelaifi, EFC representative
- (France) David Terrier, FIFPRO Europe representative

== List of UEFA office holders ==
List of presidents of UEFA

President	Nationality	Term
Ebbe Schwartz	Denmark	1954–1962
Gustav Wiederkehr	Switzerland	1962–1972
Sándor Barcs	Hungary	1972–1973 (acting)
Artemio Franchi	Italy	1973–1983
Jacques Georges	France	1983–1990
Lennart Johansson	Sweden	1990–2007
Michel Platini	France	2007–2015
Ángel María Villar	Spain	2015–2016 (acting)
Aleksander Čeferin	Slovenia	2016–present

List of secretaries general of UEFA

Chief Executive

Secretary general	Nationality	Term
Henri Delaunay	France	1954–1955
Pierre Delaunay	France	1955–1960
Hans Bangerter	Switzerland	1960–1989
Gerhard Aigner	Germany	1989–1999
Gerhard Aigner	Germany	1999–2003
Lars-Christer Olsson	Sweden	2003–2007
Gianni Infantino	Switzerland; Italy	2007
David Taylor	Scotland	2007–2009
Gianni Infantino	Switzerland; Italy	2009–2016
Theodore Theodoridis	Greece	2016–present

== Members ==
Code	Association	National teams	Founded	FIFA affiliation	UEFA affiliation	IOC member
ALB	Albania	Men's; U21; U19; U17; F; BS; Women's; U19; U17	1930	1932	1954	Yes
AND	Andorra	Men's; U21; U19; U17; F; BS; Women's; U19; U17	1994	1996	1996	Yes
ARM	Armenia	Men's; U21; U19; U17; F; BS; Women's; U19; U17	1992	1992	1992	Yes
AUT	Austria	Men's; U21; U19; U17; F; BS; Women's; U19; U17	1904	1905	1954	Yes
AZE	Azerbaijan	Men's; U21; U19; U17; F; BS; Women's; U19; U17	1992	1994	1994	Yes
BLR	Belarus	Men's; U21; U19; U17; F; BS; Women's; U19; U17	1989	1992	1993	Yes
BEL	Belgium	Men's; U21; U19; U17; F; BS; Women's; U19; U17	1895	1904	1954	Yes
BIH	Bosnia and Herzegovina	Men's; U21; U19; U17; F; BS; Women's; U19; U17	1920	1996	1998	Yes
BUL	Bulgaria	Men's; U21; U19; U17; F; BS; Women's; U19; U17	1923	1924	1954	Yes
CRO	Croatia	Men's; U21; U19; U17; F; BS; Women's; U19; U17	1912	1941	1993	Yes
CYP	Cyprus	Men's; U21; U19; U17; F; BS; Women's; U19; U17	1934	1948	1962	Yes
CZE	Czech Republic	Men's; U21; U19; U17; F; BS; Women's; U19; U17	1901	1907	1954	Yes
DEN	Denmark	Men's; U21; U19; U17; F; BS; Women's; U19; U17	1889	1904	1954	Yes
ENG	England	Men's; U21; U19; U17; F; BS; Women's; U19; U17	1863	1905	1954	No (Note: Part of the British Olympic Association.)
EST	Estonia	Men's; U21; U19; U17; F; BS; Women's; U19; U17	1921	1923	1992	Yes
FRO	Faroe Islands	Men's; U21; U19; U17; F; BS; Women's; U19; U17	1979	1988	1990	No (Note: Part of the National Olympic Committee and Sports Confederation of Denmark.)
FIN	Finland	Men's; U21; U19; U17; F; BS; Women's; U19; U17	1907	1908	1954	Yes
FRA	France	Men's; U21; U19; U17; F; BS; Women's; U19; U17	1919 (Note: Founded as Comité Français Interfédéral in 1907, a predecessor to the current federation.)	1904 (Note: The current French FA, the French Football Federation (in its previous incarnation, the Comité Français Interfédéral), replaced the USFSA in 1907.)	1954	Yes
GEO	Georgia	Men's; U21; U19; U17; F; BS; Women's; U19; U17	1990	1992	1992	Yes
GER	Germany	Men's; U21; U19; U17; F; BS; Women's; U19; U17	1900	1904	1954	Yes
GIB	Gibraltar	Men's; U21; U19; U17; F; BS; Women's; U19; U17	1895	2016	2013	No
GRE	Greece	Men's; U21; U19; U17; F; BS; Women's; U19; U17	1926	1927	1954	Yes
HUN	Hungary	Men's; U21; U19; U17; F; BS; Women's; U19; U17	1901	1906	1954	Yes
ISL	Iceland	Men's; U21; U19; U17; F; BS; Women's; U19; U17	1947 (Note: Icelandic top-flight club football dates back to 1912 or 35 years prior to founding of KSI. All titles pre-1947 are recognised by KSI)	1947	1954	Yes
ISR	Israel (Note: Former member of the Asian Football Confederation (1954–1974), joined UEFA after political pressure from Arab and Muslim members that refused to play against them. See also Foreign relations of Israel and International recognition of Israel.)	Men's; U21; U19; U17; F; BS; Women's; U19; U17	1928	1929	1994 (Note: In 1992 Israel joined UEFA as an associate member, and thereafter Israeli clubs have played in the various UEFA club competitions, while the national teams have played in UEFA championships.)	Yes
ITA	Italy	Men's; U21; U19; U17; F; BS; Women's; U19; U17	1898	1905	1954	Yes
KAZ	Kazakhstan (Note: Former member of the Asian Football Confederation (1994–2002), joined UEFA.)	Men's; U21; U19; U17; F; BS; Women's; U19; U17	1994	1994	2002	Yes (Note: Kazakhstan is a member of the Olympic Council of Asia rather than the European Olympic Committees.)
KOS	Kosovo	Men's; U21; U19; U17; F; BS; Women's; U19; U17	1946	2016	2016	Yes
LVA	Latvia	Men's; U21; U19; U17; F; BS; Women's; U19; U17	1921	1922	1992	Yes
LIE	Liechtenstein	Men's; U21; U19; U17; F; BS; Women's; U19; U17	1934	1974	1974	Yes
LTU	Lithuania	Men's; U21; U19; U17; F; BS; Women's; U19; U17	1922	1923	1992	Yes
LUX	Luxembourg	Men's; U21; U19; U17; F; BS; Women's; U19; U17	1908	1910	1954	Yes
MLT	Malta	Men's; U21; U19; U17; F; BS; Women's; U19; U17	1900	1959	1960	Yes
MDA	Moldova	Men's; U21; U19; U17; F; BS; Women's; U19; U17	1990	1994	1993	Yes
MNE	Montenegro	Men's; U21; U19; U17; F; BS; Women's; U19; U17	1931	2007	2007	Yes
NED	Netherlands	Men's; U21; U19; U17; F; BS; Women's; U19; U17	1889	1904	1954	Yes
MKD	North Macedonia	Men's; U21; U19; U17; F; BS; Women's; U19; U17	1926	1994	1994	Yes
NIR	Northern Ireland	Men's; U21; U19; U17; F; BS; Women's; U19; U17	1880	1911	1954	No
NOR	Norway	Men's; U21; U19; U17; F; BS; Women's; U19; U17	1902	1908	1954	Yes
POL	Poland	Men's; U21; U19; U17; F; BS; Women's; U19; U17	1919 (Note: Founded as Związek Polski Piłki Nożnej (part of the disintegrated Austrian Football Union) in 1911, a predecessor to the current federation.)	1923	1954	Yes
POR	Portugal	Men's; U21; U19; U17; F; BS; Women's; U19; U17	1914	1923	1954	Yes
IRL	Republic of Ireland	Men's; U21; U19; U17; F; BS; Women's; U19; U17	1921	1923	1954	Yes
ROU	Romania	Men's; U21; U19; U17; F; BS; Women's; U19; U17	1909	1923	1954	Yes
RUS	Russia	Men's; U21; U19; U17; F; BS; Women's; U19; U17	1912	1912	1954	Yes
SMR	San Marino	Men's; U21; U19; U17; F; BS; Women's; U19; U17	1931	1988	1988	Yes
SCO	Scotland	Men's; U21; U19; U17; F; BS; Women's; U19; U17	1873	1910	1954	No
SRB	Serbia	Men's; U21; U19; U17; F; BS; Women's; U19; U17	1919	1923	1954	Yes
SVK	Slovakia	Men's; U21; U19; U17; F; BS; Women's; U19; U17	1938	1939	1993	Yes
SVN	Slovenia	Men's; U21; U19; U17; F; BS; Women's; U19; U17	1920	1992	1992	Yes
ESP	Spain	Men's; U21; U19; U17; F; BS; Women's; U19; U17	1909	1904	1954	Yes
SWE	Sweden	Men's; U21; U19; U17; F; BS; Women's; U19; U17	1904	1904	1954	Yes
SUI	Switzerland	Men's; U21; U19; U17; F; BS; Women's; U19; U17	1895	1904	1954	Yes
TUR	Turkey	Men's; U21; U19; U17; F; BS; Women's; U19; U17	1923	1923	1962	Yes
UKR	Ukraine	Men's; U21; U19; U17; F; BS; Women's; U19; U17	1991	1992	1992	Yes
WAL	Wales	Men's; U21; U19; U17; F; BS; Women's; U19; U17	1876	1910	1954	No

=== Aspiring future members ===
- Jersey: In December 2015, an application was submitted to UEFA to allow Jersey to take part in international matches, following on from Gibraltar's admission two years earlier. In October 2016, Jersey's bid to join UEFA was rejected, but this decision was appealed to the Court of Arbitration for Sport (CAS) in June 2017. In September 2017, the CAS ordered the UEFA Congress to hear Jersey's case. In February 2018 a majority of the member associations of UEFA voted against admitting Jersey as a member.

=== "Special Zone" ===
In 2014 (Autonomous Republic of Crimea) Crimea was designated as a special zone by UEFA until further notice.

=== Former members ===
Association	Year	Note
Saarland	1954–1956	(Note: Joined the German Football Association.)
East Germany	1954–1990	(Note: Joined the German Football Association.)
Soviet Union; CIS	1954–1991; 1992	(Note: In 1992, the Soviet Union was dissolved into 15 republics (10 in Europe and 5 in Asia) with the Russian Football Union being acknowledged as the direct successor of the Football Federation of the Soviet Union; in spring and summer of 1992 it was represented by teams of the Commonwealth of Independent States.)
Czechoslovakia	1954–1993	(Note: Became Football Association of the Czech Republic and Slovak Football Association with both football associations acknowledged as its direct successor.)
(Socialist Federal Republic of Yugoslavia) Yugoslavia; FR Yugoslavia; Serbia and Montenegro	1954–1992; 1992–2003; 2003–2006	(Note: In 1992, the Socialist Federal Republic of Yugoslavia collapsed, with various federal republics becoming independent states. Serbia and Montenegro, which remained in SR Yugoslavia, formed a new, third Yugoslavia, called the Federal Republic of Yugoslavia. There was no direct successor of the Football Association of Yugoslavia. Four other successor republics formed their own football organisations. FR Yugoslavia was renamed the State Union of Serbia and Montenegro in 2003. In 2006, it was dissolved and the Football Association of Serbia became the successor of FA Yugoslavia. Montenegro created the Football Association of Montenegro.)

== Competitions ==
=== UEFA continental competitions ===
National teams:

Men

- UEFA European Championship
- UEFA Nations League
- UEFA European Under-21 Championship
- UEFA European Under-19 Championship
- UEFA European Under-17 Championship
- UEFA Futsal Championship
- UEFA Under-19 Futsal Championship

Women

- UEFA Women's Championship
- UEFA Women's Nations League
- UEFA Women's Under-19 Championship
- UEFA Women's Under-17 Championship
- UEFA Women's Futsal Championship

Clubs:

Men

- UEFA Champions League
- UEFA Europa League
- UEFA Conference League
- UEFA Super Cup
- UEFA Youth League
- UEFA Futsal Champions League

Women

- UEFA Women's Champions League
- UEFA Women's Europa Cup

Amateur:

- UEFA Regions' Cup

Defunct

National teams:

Men

- UEFA Under-21 Futsal Tournament

Clubs:

Men

- UEFA Cup Winners' Cup
- UEFA Intertoto Cup

Amateur:

Men

- UEFA Amateur Cup

UEFA runs official international competitions in Europe and some countries of Northern, Southwestern and Central Asia for national teams and professional clubs, known as UEFA competitions, some of which are regarded as the world's most prestigious tournaments.

UEFA is the organiser of two of the most prestigious competitions in international football: The UEFA European Championship and the UEFA Nations League. The main competition for men's national teams is the UEFA European Championship (also known as the Euro), which started in 1958, with the first finals in 1960, and was known as the European Nations Cup until 1964. The UEFA Nations League is the second tournament of UEFA and was introduced in 2018. The tournament largely replaced the international friendly matches previously played on the FIFA International Match Calendar. It will be played every two years.

UEFA also runs national competitions at Under-21, Under-19 and Under-17 levels. For women's national teams, UEFA operates the UEFA Women's Championship for senior national sides as well as Women's Under-19 and Women's Under-17 Championships.

=== World, Olympic and intercontinental competitions ===
Intercontinental national teams:

- CONMEBOL–UEFA Cup of Champions
- Women's Finalissima
- Futsal Finalissima

Defunct

- UEFA–CAF Meridian Cup

Intercontinental clubs:

- UEFA–CONMEBOL Club Challenge
- Under-20 Intercontinental Cup

Defunct

- Intercontinental Champions' Supercup
- Intercontinental Cup

Beside continental European competitions for national and their junior teams, the UEFA organises various qualification male and female tournaments among European national and their junior teams for World Cups (organised by FIFA) and Olympics (organised by IOC).

UEFA also organised the UEFA–CAF Meridian Cup with CAF for youth teams in an effort to boost youth football. UEFA launched the UEFA Regions' Cup, for semi-professional teams representing their local region, in 1999. In futsal there is the UEFA Futsal Championship and UEFA Under-19 Futsal Championship. Despite the existence of UEFA's Futsal and Beach soccer committee, UEFA does not organise any beach soccer competitions. International and club beach soccer competitions for UEFA members are organised externally by Beach Soccer Worldwide.

The Italian, German, Spanish, French and Russian (Note: Including results of the Soviet Union.) men's national teams are the only teams to have won the European football championship in all categories.

=== Club ===
UEFA member countries by club competition entry entitlements, 2009/10

The top-ranked UEFA competition is the UEFA Champions League, which started in 1955 as the European Champion Clubs' Cup (or simply the European Cup) and initially only gathered the top team of each country; this competition has since been expanded to gather the top 1–4 teams of each country's league (the number of teams depend on that country's ranking and can be upgraded or downgraded).

A second, lower-ranked competition is the UEFA Europa League. This competition, for national knockout cup winners and high-placed league teams, was launched by UEFA in 1971 as a successor of both the former UEFA Cup and the Inter-Cities Fairs Cup (also began in 1955). A third competition, the UEFA Cup Winners' Cup, which started in 1960, was absorbed into the UEFA Cup (now UEFA Europa League) in 1999.

In December 2018, UEFA announced the creation of a third club competition, later named the UEFA Europa Conference League. The competition features 32 teams in 8 groups of 4, with a knockout round between the second placed teams in Europa Conference League and the third placed teams in the Europa League, leading to a final 16 knockout stage featuring the eight group winners. The first edition of the competition was played in 2021–2022.

In women's football UEFA also conducts the UEFA Women's Champions League for club teams. The competition was first held in 2001, and was known as the UEFA Women's Cup until 2009.

The UEFA Super Cup pits the winners of the Champions League against the winners of the Europa League (previously the winners of the Cup Winners' Cup), and came into being in 1973.

The UEFA Intertoto Cup was a summer competition, previously operated by several Central European football associations, which was relaunched and recognised as official UEFA club competition by UEFA in 1995. The last Intertoto Cup took place in 2008.

The European/South American Cup was jointly organised with CONMEBOL between the Champions League and the Copa Libertadores winners.

Only five teams (Juventus, Ajax, Manchester United, Bayern Munich and Chelsea (Note: Chelsea qualified for Europa League's Round of 32 after finishing in third place in the group stage of the 2012–13 Champions League.)) have won each of the three main competitions (European Cup/UEFA Champions League, European Cup Winners' Cup/UEFA Cup Winners' Cup and UEFA Cup/UEFA Europa League), a feat that is no longer possible for any team that did not win the Cup Winners' Cup. There are currently eight teams throughout Europe that have won two of the three trophies; all but one have won the Cup Winners' Cup, four require a win in the Champions League and four require a UEFA Europa League win.

Until the first staging of the UEFA Europa Conference League in 2022, Juventus of Italy was the only team in Europe to win all UEFA's official championships and cups and, in commemoration of achieving that feat, have received The UEFA Plaque by the Union of European Football Associations on 12 July 1988.

UEFA's premier futsal competition is the UEFA Futsal Cup, a tournament started in 2001 which replaced the former Futsal European Clubs Championship. This event, despite enjoying a long and well-established tradition in the European futsal community, dating back to 1984, was never recognised as official by UEFA.

There was an attempt to create a Europa League-style second tier women's club competition, which had been in discussion since 2021. In December 2023, the attempt came into a fruition, with the first edition of the competition has been played in 2025–26. In December 2024, the name of the competition, "UEFA Women's Europa Cup", was announced.

=== Current title holders ===
Competition	Year	Champions	Title	Runners-up	Next edition
Intercontinental (UEFA–CONMEBOL)
Finalissima	2022	Argentina	2nd	Italy	TBD
Women's Finalissima	2023	England	1st	Brazil	TBD
U-20 Intercontinental Cup	2025	(Brazil) Flamengo	2nd	(Spain) Barcelona	TBD
Futsal Finalissima	2022	Portugal	1st	Spain	TBD
Men's national teams
European Championship	2024	Spain	4th	England	2028
Nations League	2024–25	Portugal	2nd	Spain	2026–27
U-21 Championship	2025	England	4th	Germany	2027
U-19 Championship	2026	Spain	13th	Germany	2027
U-17 Championship	2026	Italy	3rd	Belgium	2027
Futsal Championship	2026	Spain	8th	Portugal	2030
U-19 Futsal Championship	2025	Portugal	2nd	Spain	2027
Women's national teams
Women's Championship	2025	England	2nd	Spain	2029
Women's Nations League	2025	Spain	2nd	Germany	2027
Women's U-19 Championship	2026	Spain	8th	Germany	2027
Women's U-17 Championship	2026	Germany	9th	France	2027
Women's Futsal Championship	2023	Spain	3rd	Ukraine	2027
Men's club teams
Super Cup	2026	(France) Paris Saint-Germain	2nd	(England) Aston Villa	2027
Champions League	2025–26	(France) Paris Saint-Germain	2nd	(England) Arsenal	2026–27
Europa League	2025–26	(England) Aston Villa	1st	(Germany) SC Freiburg	2026–27
Conference League	2025–26	(England) Crystal Palace	1st	(Spain) Rayo Vallecano	2026–27
Youth League	2025–26	(Spain) Real Madrid	2nd	(Belgium) Club Brugge	2026–27
Futsal Champions League	2025–26	(Portugal) Sporting CP	3rd	(Spain) Palma Futsal	2026–27
Women's club teams
Women's Champions League	2025–26	(Spain) Barcelona	4th	(France) Lyon	2026–27
Women's Europa Cup	2025–26	(Sweden) BK Häcken	1st	(Sweden) Hammarby IF	2026–27
Men's amateur teams
Regions' Cup	2025	(Spain) Aragon	1st	(Poland) Dolnośląski	2027

=== Titles by nation ===
Nation	Men					Women				Futsal			Total
Nation	Euro	NL	U21	U19	U17	Euro	NL	U19	U17	Men's	U19	Women's	Total
Spain	4	1	5	13	9	–	2	8	5	7	2	3	59
Germany (Note: Does Not Include East Germany.)	3	–	3	3	4	8	–	6	8	–	–	–	35
France	2	1	1	8	3	–	–	5	1	–	–	–	21
England	–	–	4	11	2	2	–	1	–	–	–	–	20
Portugal	1	2	–	4	7	–	–	–	–	2	2	–	18
Italy	2	–	5	4	3	–	–	1	–	2	–	–	17
Russia (Note: Including the Soviet Union.)	1	–	2	6	3	–	–	1	–	1	–	–	14
Netherlands	1	–	2	1	4	1	–	1	1	–	–	–	11
Sweden	–	–	1	–	–	1	–	3	–	–	–	–	5
Czech Republic (Note: Including Czechoslovakia.)	1	–	1	1	1	–	–	–	–	–	–	–	4
Serbia (Note: Including Yugoslavia.)	–	–	1	3	–	–	–	–	–	–	–	–	4
Bulgaria	–	–	–	3	–	–	–	–	–	–	–	–	3
Hungary	–	–	–	3	–	–	–	–	–	–	–	–	3
Poland	–	–	–	1	1	–	–	–	1	–	–	–	3
Turkey	–	–	–	1	2	–	–	–	–	–	–	–	3
Austria	–	–	–	2	–	–	–	–	–	–	–	–	2
Denmark	1	–	–	–	–	–	–	1	–	–	–	–	2
Norway	–	–	–	–	–	2	–	–	–	–	–	–	2
Republic of Ireland	–	–	–	1	1	–	–	–	–	–	–	–	2
Belgium	–	–	–	1	–	–	–	–	–	–	–	–	1
Greece	1	–	–	–	–	–	–	–	–	–	–	–	1
Romania	–	–	–	1	–	–	–	–	–	–	–	–	1
Scotland	–	–	–	1	–	–	–	–	–	–	–	–	1
Switzerland	–	–	–	–	1	–	–	–	–	–	–	–	1
Ukraine	–	–	–	1	–	–	–	–	–	–	–	–	1

== Sponsors ==
UEFA national team competitions

- Adidas
- Alipay
- Atos
- Carlsberg Group
- Engelbert Strauss
- Hisense
- Visit Qatar

UEFA Champions League

Global sponsors

- Crypto.com
- FedEx
- Heineken
- Hyundai
- Mastercard
- PlayStation
- PepsiCo (Pepsi/Lay's)
- Qatar Airways

Suppliers and enhanced partners

- Adidas
- EA Sports
- JoyBuy
- Oppo
- Topps

Note: The UEFA Champions League sponsors are also sponsors of the UEFA Super Cup and the UEFA Youth League.

UEFA Europa League

Global sponsors

- Engelbert Strauss
- Enterprise Rent-A-Car
- FlixBus
- Hankook
- Lidl
- Just Eat Takeaway.com
- Swissquote

Suppliers

- Decathlon

Note: The UEFA Europa League sponsors are also sponsors of the UEFA Conference League.

UEFA women's football competitions

- Adidas
- Amazon
- Frito-Lay (Lay's)
- Vodafone

== FIFA World Rankings ==
=== Overview ===
FIFA Men's Rankings (as of 7 October 2026)
UEFA*	FIFA	+/-	National Team	Points
1	1	Steady	Spain	2011.57
2	3	Steady	France	1958.86
3	4	Steady	England	1925.59
4	5	▲2	Portugal	1807.69
5	8	Steady	Belgium	1779.17
6	9	Steady	Netherlands	1778.61
7	12	▲2	Switzerland	1725.39
8	13	▼1	Germany	1717.52
9	14	▼1	Croatia	1714.74
10	15	Steady	Italy	1713.04
11	19	Steady	Norway	1637.89
12	21	Steady	Denmark	1619.62
13	22	▲1	Austria	1600.66
14	31	▼4	Turkey	1563.54
15	34	▲3	Sweden	1543.8
16	35	Steady	Russia	1537.45
17	36	▼3	Ukraine	1535.27
18	37	▼1	Poland	1514.58
19	38	▲1	Hungary	1511.24
20	39	▼1	Wales	1510.37
21	41	▲5	Greece	1498.71
22	43	▼1	Scotland	1483.57
23	44	▼4	Serbia	1482.24
24	45	Steady	Slovakia	1477.34
25	51	▼3	Czech Republic	1457.12
26	52	▲4	Slovenia	1452.48
27	56	▼1	Republic of Ireland	1438.62
28	57	▲4	Bosnia and Herzegovina	1429.32
29	58	▼6	Romania	1428.88
30	64	▲6	Northern Ireland	1383.86
31	66	▲1	Albania	1375.78
32	71	▼2	North Macedonia	1350.91
33	73	▲1	Iceland	1349.42
34	74	▼2	Georgia	1345.88
35	75	Steady	Finland	1340.73
36	76	▲2	Kosovo	1328.14
37	77	▼1	Israel	1325.52
38	79	▲1	Montenegro	1315.49
39	90	▼5	Bulgaria	1262.57
40	94	▲2	Belarus	1249.6
41	101	▼3	Luxembourg	1218.8
42	108	▼1	Armenia	1183.26
43	117	▼6	Kazakhstan	1166.26
44	122	▲5	Estonia	1147.12
45	125	▼1	Cyprus	1142.43
46	126	▼3	Faroe Islands	1140.1
47	127	▼1	Azerbaijan	1138.96
48	143	▼6	Latvia	1069.33
49	148	▲1	Lithuania	1059.28
50	158	▲1	Moldova	1015.57
51	160	▲1	Malta	1006.8
52	175	▼3	Andorra	927.53
53	201	▲1	Gibraltar	829.49
54	207	▼1	Liechtenstein	790.18
55	211	Steady	San Marino	715.93
* Local rankings based on FIFA ranking points

FIFA Women's Rankings (as of 20 October 2026)
UEFA*	FIFA	+/-	National Team	Points
1	1	Steady	Spain	2121.5
2	3	Steady	Germany	2034.62
3	4	Steady	England	2025.47
4	6	Steady	France	1983.77
5	8	Steady	Sweden	1938.13
6	10	▲2	Denmark	1920.14
7	11	▼1	Netherlands	1918.3
8	13	▲1	Norway	1883.31
9	14	▼1	Italy	1871.59
10	16	▲1	Iceland	1799.75
11	20	▼2	Belgium	1780.06
12	21	Steady	Republic of Ireland	1771.66
13	22	▲2	Finland	1768.25
14	23	▲2	Scotland	1763.61
15	24	▼2	Portugal	1762.36
16	25	▼2	Austria	1747.03
17	26	Steady	Switzerland	1736.56
18	27	Steady	Russia	1723.24
19	29	Steady	Poland	1700.12
20	31	Steady	Wales	1675.49
21	32	▲2	Ukraine	1658.16
22	34	▼1	Czech Republic	1620.87
23	35	Steady	Serbia	1610.64
24	36	▲2	Slovenia	1589.24
25	45	Steady	Hungary	1499.96
26	46	▲6	Belarus	1493.33
27	47	▼1	Turkey	1489.05
28	52	▼2	Northern Ireland	1470.42
29	53	Steady	Romania	1467.5
30	57	▼3	Slovakia	1443.47
31	58	▲1	Greece	1431.82
32	63	Steady	Croatia	1398.57
33	66	Steady	Israel	1380.27
34	68	▼1	Albania	1369.56
35	71	▼1	Bosnia and Herzegovina	1355.89
36	75	Steady	Azerbaijan	1317.93
37	83	▲2	Kosovo	1265.42
38	84	▲2	Montenegro	1262.33
39	90	▲2	Malta	1218.32
40	94	Steady	Lithuania	1208.28
41	98	▲3	Estonia	1198.56
42	99	▲1	Kazakhstan	1197.2
43	102	▲3	Latvia	1179.98
44	103	Steady	Faroe Islands	1179.27
45	110	▼1	Bulgaria	1166.44
46	119	▼5	Luxembourg	1143.95
47	122	▼3	Moldova	1131.85
48	129	▲3	Georgia	1104.47
49	137	▼2	Cyprus	1076.22
50	138	▼2	North Macedonia	1075.2
51	146	▲1	Armenia	1043.34
52	179	▲2	Andorra	824.53
53	189	▲1	Liechtenstein	730.32
54	190	▼1	Gibraltar	729.18
* Local rankings based on FIFA ranking points

==== Team of the Year ====
Team ranking in the top four – Men's
Year	First	Second	Third	Fourth
2025	Spain	France	England	Portugal
2024	France	Spain	England	Portugal
2023	France	England	Belgium	Netherlands
2022	France	Belgium	England	Netherlands
2021	Belgium	France	England	Italy
2020	Belgium	France	England	Portugal
2019	Belgium	France	England	Croatia
2018	Belgium	France	Croatia	England
2017	Germany	Portugal	Belgium	Spain
2016	Germany	Belgium	France	Portugal
2015	Belgium	Spain	Germany	Portugal
2014	Germany	Belgium	Netherlands	Portugal
2013	Spain	Germany	Portugal	Italy
2012	Spain	Germany	Italy	England
2011	Spain	Netherlands	Germany	England
2010	Spain	Netherlands	Germany	England
2009	Spain	Netherlands	Italy	Portugal
2008	Spain	Germany	Netherlands	Italy
2007	Italy	Spain	Germany	Czech Republic
2006	Italy	France	England	Germany
2005	Czech Republic	Netherlands	Spain	France
2004	France	Czech Republic	Spain	Netherlands
2003	France	Spain	Netherlands	Czech Republic
2002	France	Spain	Germany	Netherlands
2001	France	Portugal	Italy	Spain
2000	France	Italy	Czech Republic	Portugal
1999	Czech Republic	France	Spain	Germany
1998	France	Germany	Croatia	FR Yugoslavia
1997	Germany	Czech Republic	England	France
1996	Germany	France	Czech Republic	Denmark
1995	Germany	Italy	Spain	Russia
1994	Spain	Sweden	Italy	Germany
1993	Germany	Italy	Norway	Spain

Team ranking in the top four – Women's
Year	First	Second	Third	Fourth
2025	Spain	Germany	England	Sweden
2024	Spain	Germany	England	Sweden
2023	Spain	France	England	Sweden
2022	Germany	Sweden	England	France
2021	Sweden	Germany	France	Netherlands
2020	Germany	France	Netherlands	Sweden
2019	Germany	Netherlands	France	Sweden
2018	Germany	France	England	Netherlands
2017	Germany	England	France	Netherlands
2016	Germany	France	England	Sweden
2015	Germany	France	England	Sweden
2014	Germany	France	Sweden	England
2013	Germany	France	Sweden	Norway
2012	Germany	France	Sweden	England
2011	Germany	Sweden	France	England
2010	Germany	Sweden	Norway	France
2009	Germany	Sweden	Norway	England
2008	Germany	Sweden	Norway	Denmark
2007	Germany	Sweden	Norway	France
2006	Germany	Norway	Sweden	France
2005	Germany	Norway	Sweden	France
2004	Germany	Norway	Sweden	Denmark
2003	Germany	Norway	Sweden	Denmark

== Major tournament records ==
Legend

- 1st – Champions
- 2nd – Runners-up
- 3rd – Third place (Note: There was no third place match in 1930; The United States and Yugoslavia lost in the semi-finals. FIFA recognises the United States as the third-placed team and Yugoslavia as the fourth-placed team using the overall records of the teams in the 1930 FIFA World Cup.)
- 4th – Fourth place
- QF – Quarter-finals (1934–1938, 1954–1970, and 1986–present: knockout round of 8)
- R3 – Round 3 (2026–present: knockout round of 16)
- R2 – Round 2 (1974–1978: second group stage, top 8; 1982: second group stage, top 12; 1986–2022: knockout round of 16; 2026–present: knockout round of 32)
- R1 – Round 1 (1930, 1950–1970 and 1986–present: group stage; 1934–1938: knockout round of 16; 1974–1982: first group stage)
- Q — Qualified for upcoming tournament
- •• – Qualified but withdrew
- • – Did not qualify
- × – Did not enter / Withdrew / Banned
- – Hosts

For each tournament, the flag of the host country and the number of teams in each finals tournament (in brackets) are shown.

=== FIFA World Cup ===
FIFA World Cup record
Team	1930 (Uruguay) (13)	1934 (Italy) (16)	1938 (France) (15)	1950 (Brazil) (13)	1954 (Switzerland) (16)	1958 (Sweden) (16)	1962 (Chile) (16)	1966 (England) (16)	1970 (Mexico) (16)	1974 (West Germany) (16)	1978 (Argentina) (16)	1982 (Spain) (24)	1986 (Mexico) (24)	1990 (Italy) (24)	1994 (United States) (24)	1998 (France) (32)	2002 (South Korea) (Japan) (32)	2006 (Germany) (32)	2010 (South Africa) (32)	2014 (Brazil) (32)	2018 (Russia) (32)	2022 (Qatar) (32)	2026 (Canada) (Mexico) (United States) (48)	2030 (Morocco) (Portugal) (Spain) (48)	2034 (Saudi Arabia) (48)	Years
Austria	×	4th	× (Note: Austria qualified in 1938, but withdrew to play as part of Germany after being annexed.)	×	3rd	R1; 15th	×	•	•	•	R2; 7th	R2; 8th	•	R1; T-18th	•	R1; 23rd	•	•	•	•	•	•	R2; 28th			8
Belgium	R1; 11th	R1; 15th	R1; 13th	×	R1; 12th	•	•	•	R1; T-10th	•	•	R2; 10th	4th	R2; 11th	R2; 11th	R1; 19th	R2; 14th	•	•	QF; 6th	3rd	R1; 23rd	QF; 6th			15
Bosnia and Herzegovina	Part of Yugoslavia														×	•	•	•	•	R1; 20th	•	•	R2; 29th			2
Bulgaria	×	•	•	×	•	•	R1; 15th	R1; 15th	R1; 13th	R1; 12th	•	•	R2; 15th	•	4th	R1; 29th	•	•	•	•	•	•	•			7
Croatia	Part of Yugoslavia														×	3rd	R1; 23rd	R1; 22nd	•	R1; 19th	2nd	3rd	R2; 20th			7
Czech Republic (Note: Both FIFA and UEFA consider that the national team of Germany succeeds West Germany and East Germany, the national team of Russia succeeds the USSR, the national team of Serbia succeeds Yugoslavia/Serbia and Montenegro, and the national team of the Czech Republic succeeds Czechoslovakia.)	×	2nd	QF; 5th	×	R1; 14th	R1; 9th	2nd	•	R1; 15th	•	•	R1; 19th	•	QF; 6th	•	•	•	R1; 20th	•	•	•	•	R1; 39th			10
Denmark	×	×	×	×	×	•	×	•	•	•	•	•	R2; 9th	•	•	QF; 8th	R2; 10th	•	R1; 24th	•	R2; 11th	R1; 28th	•			6
East Germany	Part of Germany			×	×	•	•	•	•	R2; 6th	•	•	•	•	Part of Germany											1
England	×	×	×	R1; 8th	QF; 6th	R1; 11th	QF; 8th	1st	QF; 8th	•	•	R2; 6th	QF; 8th	4th	•	R2; 9th	QF; 6th	QF; 7th	R2; 13th	R1; 26th	4th	QF; 6th	3rd			17
France	R1; 7th	R1; T-9th	QF; 6th	•	R1; 11th	3rd	•	R1; T-13th	•	•	R1; 12th	4th	3rd	•	•	1st	R1; 28th	2nd	R1; 29th	QF; 7th	1st	2nd	4th			17
Germany	×	3rd	R1; 10th	×	1st	4th	QF; 7th	2nd	3rd	1st	R2; 6th	2nd	2nd	1st	QF; 5th	QF; 7th	2nd	3rd	3rd	1st	R1; 22nd	R1; 17th	R2; 18th			21
Greece	×	•	•	×	•	•	•	•	•	•	•	•	•	•	R1; 24th	•	•	•	R1; 25th	R2; 13th	•	•	•			3
Hungary	×	QF; 6th	2nd	×	2nd	R1; 10th	QF; 5th	QF; 6th	•	•	R1; 15th	R1; 14th	R1; 18th	•	•	•	•	•	•	•	•	•	•			9
Iceland	×	×	×	×	×	•	×	×	×	•	•	•	•	•	•	•	•	•	•	•	R1; 28th	•	•			1
Israel (Note: Israel competed as Eretz Yisrael (Land of Israel) in 1934 and in 1938, with a team consisting exclusively of Jewish and British footballers from the Palestine Mandate.)	×	•	•	•	•	•	•	•	R1; 12th	•	•	•	•	•	•	•	•	•	•	•	•	•	•			1
Italy	×	1st	1st	R1; 7th	R1; 10th	•	R1; 9th	R1; 9th	2nd	R1; 10th	4th	1st	R2; 12th	3rd	2nd	QF; 5th	R2; 15th	1st	R1; 26th	R1; 22nd	•	•	•			18
Netherlands	×	R1; T-9th	R1; 14th	×	×	•	•	•	•	2nd	2nd	•	•	R2; 15th	QF; 7th	4th	•	R2; 11th	2nd	3rd	•	QF; 5th	R2; 17th			12
Northern Ireland	×	×	×	•	•	QF; 8th	•	•	•	•	•	R2; 9th	R1; 21st	•	•	•	•	•	•	•	•	•	•			3
Norway	×	×	R1; 12th	×	•	•	•	•	•	•	•	•	•	•	R1; 17th	R2; 15th	•	•	•	•	•	•	QF; 5th			4
Poland	×	•	R1; 11th	×	×	•	•	•	•	3rd	R2; 5th	3rd	R2; 14th	•	•	•	R1; 25th	R1; 21st	•	•	R1; 25th	R2; 15th	•			9
Portugal	×	•	•	•	•	•	•	3rd	•	•	•	•	R1; 17th	•	•	•	R1; 21st	4th	R2; 11th	R1; 18th	R2; 13th	QF; 8th	R3; 13th	Q		9
Republic of Ireland (Note: Republic of Ireland competed as the Irish Free State in 1934 and then as Ireland in 1938 and 1950.)	×	•	•	•	•	•	•	•	•	•	•	•	•	QF; 8th	R2; 16th	•	R2; 12th	•	•	•	•	•	•			3
Romania	R1; 8th	R1; 12th	R1; 9th	×	•	•	•	•	R1; T-10th	•	•	•	•	R2; 12th	QF; 6th	R2; 11th	•	•	•	•	•	•	•			7
Russia (Note: Russia's best result is quarter-finals in 2018. However, FIFA considers Russia as the successor team of the USSR.)	×	×	×	×	×	QF; 7th	QF; 6th	4th	QF; 5th	•	•	R2; 7th	R2; 10th	R1; 17th	R1; 18th	•	R1; 22nd	•	•	R1; 24th	QF; 8th	×	×			11
Scotland	×	×	×	••	R1; 15th	R1; 14th	•	•	•	R1; 9th	R1; 11th	R1; 15th	R1; 19th	R1; T-18th	•	R1; 27th	•	•	•	•	•	•	R1; 36th			9
Serbia	4th	•	•	R1; 5th	QF; 7th	QF; 5th	4th	•	•	R2; 7th	•	R1; 16th	•	QF; 5th	×	R2; 10th	•	R1; 32nd	R1; 23rd	•	R1; 23rd	R1; 29th	•			13
Slovakia (Note: FIFA consider that the national teams of the Czech Republic and Slovakia succeeds Czechoslovakia.)	×	2nd	QF; 5th	×	R1; 14th	R1; 9th	2nd	•	R1; 15th	•	•	R1; 19th	•	QF; 6th	•	•	•	•	R2; 16th	•	•	•	•			1
Slovenia	Part of Yugoslavia														×	•	R1; 30th	•	R1; 18th	•	•	•	•			2
Spain	×	QF; 5th	×	4th	•	•	R1; 12th	R1; 10th	•	•	R1; 10th	R2; 12th	QF; 7th	R2; 10th	QF; 8th	R1; 17th	QF; 5th	R2; 9th	1st	R1; 23rd	R2; 10th	R2; 13th	1st	Q		17
Sweden	×	QF; 8th	4th	3rd	•	2nd	•	•	R1; 9th	R2; 5th	R1; 13th	•	•	R1; 21st	3rd	•	R2; 13th	R2; 14th	•	•	QF; 7th	•	R2; 27th			13
Switzerland	×	QF; 7th	QF; 7th	R1; 6th	QF; 8th	•	R1; 16th	R1; 16th	•	•	•	•	•	•	R2; 15th	•	•	R2; 10th	R1; 19th	R2; 11th	R2; 14th	R2; 12th	QF; T-7th			13
Turkey	×	×	×	••	R1; 9th	×	•	•	•	•	•	•	•	•	•	•	3rd	•	•	•	•	•	R1; 35th			3
Ukraine	Part of Soviet Union														×	•	•	QF; 8th	•	•	•	•	•			1
Wales	×	×	×	•	•	QF; 6th	•	•	•	•	•	•	•	•	•	•	•	•	•	•	•	R1; 30th	•			2
Total (34 teams)	4	12	13	6	12	12	10	10	9	9	10	14	14	14	13	15	15	14	13	13	13	13	16	TBD	TBD	

=== FIFA Women's World Cup ===
FIFA Women's World Cup record
Team	1991 (China) (12)	1995 (Sweden) (12)	1999 (United States) (16)	2003 (United States) (16)	2007 (China) (16)	2011 (Germany) (16)	2015 (Canada) (24)	2019 (France) (24)	2023 (Australia) (New Zealand) (32)	2027 (Brazil) (32)	Years
Denmark	QF; 7th	QF; 7th	R1; 15th	•	R1; 12th	•	•	•	R2; 11th	Q	6
England	•	QF; 6th	•	•	QF; 7th	QF; 7th	3rd	4th	2nd		6
France	•	•	•	R1; 9th	•	4th	QF; 5th	QF; 6th	QF; 6th	Q	6
Germany	4th	2nd	QF; 8th	1st	1st	QF; 6th	4th	QF; 5th	R1; 17th	Q	10
Italy	QF; 6th	•	R1; 9th	•	•	•	•	QF; 7th	R1; 22nd		4
Netherlands	•	•	•	•	•	•	R2; 13th	2nd	QF; 7th		3
Norway	2nd	1st	4th	QF; 7th	4th	R1; 10th	R2; 10th	QF; 8th	R2; 15th		9
Portugal	×	•	•	•	•	•	•	•	R1; 19th		1
Republic of Ireland	•	×	•	•	•	•	•	•	R1; 26th		1
Russia	×	•	QF; 5th	QF; 8th	•	•	•	•	×	×	2
Scotland	•	•	•	•	•	•	•	R1; 19th	•		1
Spain	•	•	•	•	•	•	R1; 20th	R2; 12th	1st	Q	4
Sweden	3rd	QF; 5th	QF; 6th	2nd	R1; T-10th	3rd	R2; 16th	3rd	3rd		9
Switzerland	•	•	•	•	•	•	R2; 15th	•	R2; 14th		2
Total (14 teams)	5	5	6	5	5	5	8	9	12	11/12	60

=== Olympic Games ===
==== Men's tournament ====
Olympic Games (Men's tournament) record
Team	1900 (France) (3)	1904 (United States) (3)	1908 (United Kingdom) (6)	1912 (Sweden) (11)	1920 (Belgium) (14)	1924 (France) (22)	1928 (Netherlands) (17)	1936 (Germany) (16)	1948 (United Kingdom) (18)	1952 (Finland) (25)	1956 (Australia) (11)	1960 (Italy) (16)	1964 (Japan) (14)	1968 (Mexico) (16)	1972 (West Germany) (16)	1976 (Canada) (13)	1980 (Soviet Union) (16)	1984 (United States) (16)	1988 (South Korea) (16)	1992 (Spain) (16)	1996 (United States) (16)	2000 (Australia) (16)	2004 (Greece) (16)	2008 (China) (16)	2012 (United Kingdom) (16)	2016 (Brazil) (16)	2020 (Japan) (16)	2024 (France) (16)	Years
Austria	–	–	–	6	–	–	–	2	=11	=5	–	–	–	–	–	–	–	–	–	–	–	–	–	–	–	–	–	–	4
Belarus	–	–	–	–	–	–	–	–	–	–	–	–	–	–	–	–	–	–	–	–	–	–	–	–	10	–	–	–	1
Belgium	3	–	–	–	1	15	=5	–	–	–	–	–	–	–	–	–	–	–	–	–	–	–	–	4	–	–	–	–	5
Bulgaria	–	–	–	–	–	10	–	–	–	=17	3	5	–	2	–	–	–	–	–	–	–	–	–	–	–	–	–	–	5
Czech Republic	–	–	–	–	–	–	–	–	–	–	–	–	–	–	–	–	–	–	–	–	–	14	–	–	–	–	–	–	1
Czechoslovakia	–	–	–	–	9	9	–	–	–	–	–	–	2	9	–	–	1	–	–	Split into Slovakia and Czech Republic									5
Denmark	–	–	2	2	10	–	–	–	3	=5	–	2	–	–	6	–	–	–	–	13	–	–	–	–	–	8	–	–	9
East Germany (Note: The East German team represented the United Team of Germany in 1964, winning the bronze medal.)	–	–	–	–	–	–	–	–	–	–	–	–	3	–	3	1	2	–	–	Merged with West Germany									4
Estonia	–	–	–	–	–	=17	–	–	–	–	–	–	–	–	–	–	–	–	–	–	–	–	–	–	–	–	–	–	1
Finland	–	–	–	4	–	–	–	=9	–	=14	–	–	–	–	–	–	9	–	–	–	–	–	–	–	–	–	–	–	4
France	2	–	5	–	4	5	=9	–	=5	=17	–	9	–	7	–	5	–	1	–	–	5	–	–	–	–	–	13	2	14
Germany (Note: The team represented the United Team of Germany in 1956, and the Federal Republic of Germany (i.e., West Germany) in 1972, 1984 and 1988, and winning the bronze medal in 1988.)	–	–	–	7	–	–	=5	=6	–	4	=9	–	–	–	5	–	–	5	3	–	–	–	–	–	–	2	9	–	10
Great Britain	1	–	1	1	11	–	–	=6	4	=17	=5	8	–	–	–	–	–	–	–	–	–	–	–	–	5	–	–	–	10
Greece	–	–	–	–	13	–	–	–	–	=17	–	–	–	–	–	–	–	–	–	–	–	–	15	–	–	–	–	–	3
Hungary	–	–	–	5	–	13	–	=9	–	1	–	3	1	1	2	–	–	–	–	–	16	–	–	–	–	–	–	–	9
Ireland	–	–	–	–	–	7	–	–	=17	–	–	–	–	–	–	–	–	–	–	–	–	–	–	–	–	–	–	–	2
Israel	Competed with Asia (qualified 2 times)																–	–	–	–	–	–	–	–	–	–	–	15	3
Italy	–	–	–	8	5	6	3	1	=5	=9	–	4	–	–	–	–	–	4	4	5	12	5	3	5	–	–	–	–	15
Latvia	–	–	–	–	–	16	–	–	–	–	–	–	–	–	–	–	–	–	–	–	–	–	–	–	–	–	–	–	1
Lithuania	–	–	–	–	–	=17	–	–	–	–	–	–	–	–	–	–	–	–	–	–	–	–	–	–	–	–	–	–	1
Luxembourg	–	–	–	–	12	11	=9	=9	=9	=9	–	–	–	–	–	–	–	–	–	–	–	–	–	–	–	–	–	–	6
Netherlands	–	–	3	3	3	4	=9	–	=9	=17	–	–	–	–	–	–	–	–	–	–	–	–	–	7	–	–	–	–	8
Norway	–	–	–	9	7	–	–	3	–	=14	–	–	–	–	–	–	–	10	–	–	–	–	–	–	–	–	–	–	5
Poland	–	–	–	–	–	=17	–	4	–	=9	–	10	–	–	1	2	–	–	–	2	–	–	–	–	–	–	–	–	7
Portugal	–	–	–	–	–	–	=5	–	–	–	–	–	–	–	–	–	–	–	–	–	4	–	14	–	–	6	–	–	4
Romania	–	–	–	–	–	14	–	–	–	=17	–	–	5	–	–	–	–	–	–	–	–	–	–	–	–	–	11	–	4
Russia	–	–	–	10	–	–	–	–	–	–	–	–	–	–	–	–	–	–	–	–	–	–	–	–	–	–	–	–	1
Serbia	–	–	–	–	–	–	–	–	–	–	–	–	–	–	–	–	–	–	–	–	–	–	–	12	–	–	–	–	1
Serbia and Montenegro	–	–	–	–	–	–	–	–	–	–	–	–	–	–	–	–	–	–	–	–	–	–	16	Split into 2 nations					1
Slovakia	–	–	–	–	–	–	–	–	–	–	–	–	–	–	–	–	–	–	–	–	–	13	–	–	–	–	–	–	1
Soviet Union	–	–	–	–	–	–	–	–	–	=9	1	–	–	–	3	3	3	–	1	–	Split into 15 nations								6
Spain	–	–	–	–	2	=17	=5	–	–	–	–	–	–	6	–	12	10	–	–	1	6	2	–	–	14	–	2	1	12
Sweden	–	–	4	11	6	3	–	=9	1	3	–	–	–	–	–	–	–	–	6	6	–	–	–	–	–	15	–	–	10
Switzerland	–	–	–	–	–	2	=9	–	–	–	–	–	–	–	–	–	–	–	–	–	–	–	–	–	13	–	–	–	3
Turkey	–	–	–	–	–	=17	=9	=9	=5	=5	–	14	–	–	–	–	–	–	–	–	–	–	–	–	–	–	–	–	6
Ukraine	–	–	–	–	–	–	–	–	–	–	–	–	–	–	–	–	–	–	–	–	–	–	–	–	–	–	–	9	1
Yugoslavia	–	–	–	–	9	=17	=9	–	2	2	2	1	6	–	–	–	4	3	10	–	Split into 7 nations								11
Total (37 teams)	3	0	6	11	13	18	11	10	10	19	5	9	6	5	6	5	6	5	5	5	5	4	4	4	4	4	4	4	

==== Women's tournament ====
Olympic Games (Women's tournament) record
Team	1996 (United States) (8)	2000 (Australia) (8)	2004 (Greece) (10)	2008 (China) (12)	2012 (United Kingdom) (12)	2016 (Brazil) (12)	2020 (Japan) (12)	2024 (France) (12)	Years
Denmark	8	–	–	–	–	–	–	–	1
France	–	–	–	–	4	6	–	6	3
Germany	5	3	3	3	–	1	–	3	6
Great Britain	–	–	–	–	5	–	7	–	2
Greece	–	–	10	–	–	–	–	–	1
Netherlands	–	–	–	–	–	–	5	–	1
Norway	3	1	–	7	–	–	–	–	3
Spain	–	–	–	–	–	–	–	4	1
Sweden	6	6	4	6	7	2	2	–	7
Total (9 teams)	4	3	3	3	3	3	3	3	25

=== UEFA European Championship ===
UEFA European Championship record
Team (Total 36 teams)	1960 (France) (4)	1964 (Spain) (4)	1968 (Italy) (4)	1972 (Belgium) (4)	1976 (Socialist Federal Republic of Yugoslavia) (4)	1980 (Italy) (8)	1984 (France) (8)	1988 (West Germany) (8)	1992 (Sweden) (8)	1996 (England) (16)	2000 (Belgium) (Netherlands) (16)	2004 (Portugal) (16)	2008 (Austria) (Switzerland) (16)	2012 (Poland) (Ukraine) (16)	2016 (France) (24)	2020 (Europe) (24)	2024 (Germany) (24)	2028 (England) (Scotland) (Wales) (Republic of Ireland) (24)	2032 (Italy) (Turkey) (24)	Years
Albania	×	•	•	•	×	×	•	•	•	•	•	•	•	•	GS	•	GS			2
Austria	•	•	•	•	•	•	•	•	•	•	•	•	GS	•	GS	R16	R16			4
Belgium	×	•	•	3rd	•	2nd	GS	•	•	•	GS	•	•	•	QF	QF	R16			7
Bulgaria	•	•	•	•	•	•	•	•	•	GS	•	GS	•	•	•	•	•			2
Croatia	Part of Yugoslavia									QF	•	GS	QF	GS	R16	R16	GS			7
Czech Republic (Note: Includes three appearances as Czechoslovakia)	3rd	•	•	•	1st	3rd	•	•	•	2nd	GS	SF	GS	QF	GS	QF	GS			11
Denmark	•	4th	•	•	•	•	SF	GS	1st	GS	GS	QF	•	GS	•	SF	R16			10
England	×	•	3rd	•	•	GS	•	GS	GS	SF	GS	QF	•	QF	R16	2nd	2nd			11
Finland	×	×	•	•	•	•	•	•	•	•	•	•	•	•	•	GS	•			1
France	4th	•	•	•	•	•	1st	•	GS	SF	1st	QF	GS	QF	2nd	R16	SF			11
Georgia	Part of Soviet Union									•	•	•	•	•	•	•	R16			1
Germany (Note: Includes five appearances as West Germany)	×	×	•	1st	2nd	1st	GS	SF	2nd	1st	GS	GS	2nd	SF	SF	R16	QF			14
Greece	•	× (Note: Greece entered the 1964 competition, but later withdrew after refusing to play Albania.)	•	•	•	GS	•	•	•	•	•	1st	GS	QF	•	•	•			4
Hungary	•	3rd	•	4th	•	•	•	•	•	•	•	•	•	•	R16	GS	GS			5
Iceland	×	•	×	×	•	•	•	•	•	•	•	•	•	•	QF	•	•			1
Italy	×	•	1st	•	•	4th	•	SF	•	GS	2nd	GS	QF	2nd	QF	1st	R16		Q	11
Latvia	Part of Soviet Union									•	•	GS	•	•	•	•	•			1
Netherlands	×	•	•	•	3rd	GS	•	1st	SF	QF	SF	SF	QF	GS	•	R16	SF			11
North Macedonia	Part of Yugoslavia									•	•	•	•	•	•	GS	•			1
Northern Ireland	×	•	•	•	•	•	•	•	•	•	•	•	•	•	R16	•	•			1
Norway	•	•	•	•	•	•	•	•	•	•	GS	•	•	•	•	•	•			1
Poland	•	•	•	•	•	•	•	•	•	•	•	•	GS	GS	QF	GS	GS			5
Portugal	•	•	•	•	•	•	SF	•	•	QF	SF	2nd	QF	SF	1st	R16	QF			9
Republic of Ireland	•	•	•	•	•	•	•	GS	•	•	•	•	•	GS	R16	•	•			3
Romania	•	•	•	•	•	•	GS	•	•	GS	QF	•	GS	•	GS	•	R16			6
Russia (Note: Includes five appearances as the Soviet Union and one as CIS)	1st	2nd	4th	2nd	•	•	•	2nd	GS	GS	•	GS	SF	GS	GS	GS	×			12
Scotland	×	×	•	•	•	•	•	•	GS	GS	•	•	•	•	•	GS	GS			4
Serbia (Note: Includes four appearances as Yugoslavia and one as FR Yugoslavia)	2nd	•	2nd	•	4th	•	GS	•	•× (Note: Does not include Euro 1992 qualification and disqualification due to international sanctions)	×	QF	•	•	•	•	•	GS			6
Slovakia (Note: Includes three appearances as Czechoslovakia.)	3rd	•	•	•	1st	3rd	•	•	•	•	•	•	•	•	R16	GS	R16			6
Slovenia	Part of Yugoslavia									•	GS	•	•	•	•	•	R16			2
Spain	•× (Note: Spain refused to travel to the Soviet Union for their qualification match, so the Soviet Union qualified by walkover.)	1st	•	•	•	GS	2nd	GS	•	QF	QF	GS	1st	1st	R16	SF	1st			12
Sweden	×	•	•	•	•	•	•	•	SF	•	GS	QF	GS	GS	GS	R16	•			7
Switzerland	×	•	•	•	•	•	•	•	•	GS	•	GS	GS	•	R16	QF	QF			6
Turkey	•	•	•	•	•	•	•	•	•	GS	QF	•	SF	•	GS	GS	QF		Q	6
Ukraine	Part of Soviet Union									•	•	•	•	GS	GS	QF	GS			4
Wales	×	•	•	•	•	•	•	•	•	•	•	•	•	•	SF	R16	•			2

=== UEFA Women's Championship ===
Team	1984 (4)	1987 (Norway) (4)	1989 (West Germany) (4)	1991 (Denmark) (4)	1993 (Italy) (4)	1995 (4)	1997 (Norway) (Sweden) (8)	2001 (Germany) (8)	2005 (England) (8)	2009 (Finland) (12)	2013 (Sweden) (12)	2017 (Netherlands) (16)	2022 (England) (16)	2025 (Switzerland) (16)	2029 (Germany) (16)	Total
Austria	×	×	×	×	×	×	•	•	•	•	•	SF	QF	•		2
Belgium	•	•	•	•	•	•	•	•	•	•	•	GS	QF	GS		3
Denmark	SF	•	•	3rd	3rd	•	GS	SF	GS	GS	SF	2nd	GS	GS		11
England	2nd	4th	•	•	•	SF	•	GS	GS	2nd	GS	SF	1st	1st		10
Finland	•	•	•	•	•	•	•	•	SF	QF	GS	•	GS	GS		5
France	•	•	•	•	•	•	GS	GS	GS	QF	QF	QF	SF	QF		8
Germany (Note: Includes participations as West Germany before 1991.)	•	•	1st	1st	4th	1st	1st	1st	1st	1st	1st	QF	2nd	SF	Q	13
Iceland	•	×	×	×	•	•	•	•	•	GS	QF	GS	GS	GS		5
Italy	SF	3rd	4th	4th	2nd	•	2nd	GS	GS	QF	QF	GS	GS	SF		13
Netherlands	•	•	•	•	•	•	•	•	•	SF	GS	1st	QF	GS		5
Northern Ireland	•	•	×	•	×	×	×	×	×	•	•	•	GS	•		1
Norway	•	1st	2nd	2nd	1st	SF	GS	SF	2nd	SF	2nd	GS	GS	QF		13
Poland	×	×	×	•	•	•	•	•	•	•	•	•	•	GS		1
Portugal	•	•	•	•	•	•	•	•	•	•	•	GS	GS	GS		3
Russia	Part of Soviet Union				•	•	GS	GS	•	GS	GS	GS	×	×		5
Scotland	•	•	×	×	•	•	•	•	•	•	•	GS	•	•		1
Spain	×	•	•	•	•	•	SF	•	•	•	QF	QF	QF	2nd		5
Sweden	1st	2nd	3rd	•	•	2nd	SF	2nd	SF	QF	SF	QF	SF	QF		12
Switzerland	•	•	•	•	•	•	•	•	•	•	•	GS	GS	QF		3
Ukraine	Part of Soviet Union				×	•	•	•	•	GS	•	•	•	•		1
Wales	×	×	×	×	•	•	•	•	×	•	•	•	•	GS		1

=== FIFA U-20 World Cup ===
FIFA U-20 World Cup record
Team	1977 (Tunisia) (16)	1979 (Japan) (16)	1981 (Australia) (16)	1983 (Mexico) (16)	1985 (Soviet Union) (16)	1987 (Chile) (16)	1989 (Saudi Arabia) (16)	1991 (Portugal) (16)	1993 (Australia) (16)	1995 (Qatar) (16)	1997 (Malaysia) (24)	1999 (Nigeria) (24)	2001 (Argentina) (24)	2003 (United Arab Emirates) (24)	2005 (Netherlands) (24)	2007 (Canada) (24)	2009 (Egypt) (24)	2011 (Colombia) (24)	2013 (Turkey) (24)	2015 (New Zealand) (24)	2017 (South Korea) (24)	2019 (Poland) (24)	2023 (Argentina) (24)	2025 (Chile) (24)	Years
Austria	R1	•	•	R1	•	•	•	•	•	•	•	•	•	•	•	4th	•	R1	•	R2	•	•	•	•	5
Belgium	•	•	•	•	•	•	•	•	•	•	R2	•	•	•	•	•	•	•	•	•	•	•	•	•	1
Bulgaria	•	•	•	•	QF	QF	•	•	•	•	•	•	•	•	•	•	•	•	•	•	•	•	•	•	2
Croatia									•	•	•	R2	•	•	•	•	•	R1	R2	•	•	•	•	•	3
Czech Republic	•	•	•	R1	•	•	R1	•	•	•	•	•	QF	R1	•	2nd	R2	•	•	•	•	•	•	•	6
East Germany	•	•	•	•	•	3rd	R1	•																	2
England	•	•	4th	•	R1	•	•	R1	3rd	•	R2	R1	•	R1	•	•	R1	R2	R1	•	1st	•	R2	•	12
Finland	•	•	•	•	•	•	•	•	•	•	•	•	R1	•	•	•	•	•	•	•	•	•	•	•	1
France	R1	•	•	•	•	•	•	•	•	•	QF	•	QF	•	•	•	•	4th	1st	•	R2	R2	R1	4th	9
Germany	•	•	1st	•	•	2nd	•	•	R1	R1	•	R1	R2	R1	QF	•	QF	•	•	QF	R2	•	•	•	11
Greece	•	•	•	•	•	•	•	•	•	•	•	•	•	•	•	•	•	•	R2	•	•	•	•	•	1
Hungary	R1	R1	•	•	R1	•	•	•	•	•	R1	•	•	•	•	•	3rd	•	•	R2	•	•	•	•	6
Israel	•	•	•	•	•	•	•	•	•	•	•	•	•	•	•	•	•	•	•	•	•	•	3rd	•	1
Italy	R1	•	R1	•	•	QF	•	•	•	•	•	•	•	•	QF	•	QF	•	•	•	3rd	4th	2nd	R2	9
Kazakhstan (Note: Kazakhstan represented AFC before 2000.)									•	•	•	R1	•	•	•	•	•	•	•	•	•	•	•	•	1
Netherlands	•	•	•	QF	•	•	•	•	•	R1	•	•	QF	•	QF	•	•	•	•	•	•	•	•	•	4
Norway	•	•	•	•	•	•	R1	•	R1	•	•	•	•	•	•	•	•	•	•	•	•	R1	•	QF	4
Poland	•	4th	R1	3rd	•	•	•	•	•	•	•	•	•	•	•	R2	•	•	•	•	•	R2	•	•	5
Portugal	•	QF	•	•	•	•	1st	1st	R1	3rd	•	R2	•	•	•	R2	•	2nd	R2	QF	QF	R1	•	•	12
Republic of Ireland	•	•	•	•	R1	•	•	R1	•	•	3rd	R2	•	R2	•	•	•	•	•	•	•	•	•	•	5
Romania	•	•	3rd	•	•	•	•	•	•	•	•	•	•	•	•	•	•	•	•	•	•	•	•	•	1
Russia	1st	2nd	•	R1	4th	•	QF	3rd	QF	QF	•	•	•	•	•	•	•	•	•	•	•	•	•	•	8
Scotland	•	•	•	QF	•	QF	•	•	•	•	•	•	•	•	•	R1	•	•	•	•	•	•	•	•	3
Serbia	•	R1	•	•	•	1st	•	•	•	•	•	•	•	•	•	•	•	•	•	1st	•	•	•	•	3
Slovakia	•	•	•	R1	•	•	R1	•	•	•	•	•	•	R2	•	•	•	•	•	•	•	•	R2	•	2
Spain	R1	QF	R1	•	2nd	•	R1	QF	•	4th	QF	1st	•	2nd	QF	QF	R2	QF	QF	•	•	•	•	QF	16
Sweden	•	•	•	•	•	•	•	R1	•	•	•	•	•	•	•	•	•	•	•	•	•	•	•	•	1
Switzerland	•	•	•	•	•	•	•	•	•	•	•	•	•	•	R1	•	•	•	•	•	•	•	•	•	1
Turkey	•	•	•	•	•	•	•	•	R1	•	•	•	•	•	R2	•	•	•	R2	•	•	•	•	•	3
Ukraine									•	•	•	•	R2	•	R2	•	•	•	•	R2	•	1st	•	R2	5
Total (30 teams)	6	6	6	6	6	6	6	6	6	5	6	7	6	6	7	6	6	6	7	6	5	6	5	5	

=== FIFA U-20 Women's World Cup ===
FIFA U-20 Women's World Cup record
Team	2002 (Canada) (12)	2004 (Thailand) (12)	2006 (Russia) (16)	2008 (Chile) (16)	2010 (Germany) (16)	2012 (Japan) (16)	2014 (Canada) (16)	2016 (Papua New Guinea) (16)	2018 (France) (16)	2022 (Costa Rica) (16)	2024 (Colombia) (24)	2026 (Poland) (24)	Years
Austria	•	•	•	•	•	•	•	•	•	•	R2	•	1
Denmark	QF	•	•	•	•	•	•	•	•	•	•	•	1
England	QF	•	•	QF	R1	•	R1	•	3rd	•	•	R2	6
Finland	•	•	R1	•	•	•	R1	•	•	•	•	•	2
France	R1	•	QF	4th	R1	•	3rd	2nd	4th	QF	R2	R2	10
Germany	3rd	1st	QF	3rd	1st	2nd	1st	QF	QF	R1	QF	•	11
Italy	•	R1	•	•	•	R1	•	•	•	•	•	4th	3
Netherlands	•	•	•	•	•	•	•	•	QF	4th	4th	•	3
Norway	•	•	•	R1	•	QF	•	•	•	•	•	•	2
Poland	•	•	•	•	•	•	•	•	•	•	•	R2	1
Portugal	•	•	•	•	•	•	•	•	•	•	•	R2	1
Russia	•	QF	QF	•	•	•	•	•	•	•	×	×	2
Spain	•	R1	•	•	•	•	•	QF	2nd	1st	QF	1st	6
Sweden	•	•	•	•	QF	•	•	R1	•	•	•	•	2
Switzerland	•	•	R1	•	R1	R1	•	•	•	•	•	•	3
Total (13 teams)	4	4	5	4	5	4	4	4	5	4	5	6	54

=== FIFA U-17 World Cup ===
FIFA U-17 World Cup record
Team	1985 (China) (16)	1987 (Canada) (16)	1989 (Scotland) (16)	1991 (Italy) (16)	1993 (Japan) (16)	1995 (Ecuador) (16)	1997 (Egypt) (16)	1999 (New Zealand) (16)	2001 (Trinidad and Tobago) (16)	2003 (Finland) (16)	2005 (Peru) (16)	2007 (South Korea) (24)	2009 (Nigeria) (24)	2011 (Mexico) (24)	2013 (United Arab Emirates) (24)	2015 (Chile) (24)	2017 (India) (24)	2019 (Brazil) (24)	2023 (Indonesia) (24)	2025 (Qatar) (48)	2026 (Qatar) (48)	Years
Austria	•	•	•	•	•	•	R1	•	•	•	•	•	•	•	R1	•	•	•	•	2nd	•	3
Belgium	•	•	•	•	•	•	•	•	•	•	•	R1	•	•	•	3rd	•	•	•	R2	Q	4
Croatia					•	•	•	•	R1	•	•	•	•	•	R1	QF	•	•	•	R2	Q	5
Czech Republic	•	•	•	•	QF	•	•	•	•	•	•	•	•	R1	•	•	•	•	•	R2	•	3
Denmark	•	•	•	•	•	•	•	•	•	•	•	•	•	R1	•	•	•	•	•	•	Q	2
East Germany	•	•	QF	•	Merged with West Germany																	1
England	•	•	•	•	•	•	•	•	•	•	•	QF	•	QF	•	R1	1st	•	R2	R3	•	6
Finland	•	•	•	•	•	•	•	•	•	R1	•	•	•	•	•	•	•	•	•	•	•	1
France	•	QF	•	•	•	•	•	•	1st	•	•	QF	•	QF	•	R2	R2	3rd	2nd	R3	Q	10
Germany	2nd	•	•	QF	•	R1	4th	R1	•	•	•	3rd	R2	3rd	•	R2	QF	•	1st	R2	•	12
Greece	•	•	•	•	•	•	•	•	•	•	•	•	•	•	•	•	•	•	•	•	Q	1
Hungary	QF	•	•	•	•	•	•	•	•	•	•	•	•	•	•	•	•	R1	•	•	•	2
Italy	R1	4th	•	R1	R1	•	•	•	•	•	R1	•	QF	•	R2	•	•	QF	•	3rd	Q	10
Montenegro												•	•	•	•	•	•	•	•	•	Q	1
Netherlands	•	•	•	•	•	•	•	•	•	•	3rd	•	R1	R1	•	•	•	4th	•	•	•	4
Poland	•	•	•	•	4th	•	•	R1	•	•	•	•	•	•	•	•	•	•	R1	•	•	3
Portugal	•	•	3rd	•	•	QF	•	•	•	QF	•	•	•	•	•	•	•	•	•	1st	•	4
Republic of Ireland	×	•	•	•	•	•	•	•	•	•	•	•	•	•	•	•	•	•	•	R3	Q	2
Romania	•	•	•	•	•	•	•	•	•	•	•	•	•	•	•	•	•	•	•	•	Q	1
Russia	•	1st	•	•	•	•	•	•	•	•	•	•	•	•	R2	R2	•	•	×	×	×	3
Scotland	•	•	2nd	•	•	•	•	•	•	•	•	•	•	•	•	•	•	•	•	•	•	1
Serbia	•	•	•	•	•	•	•	•	•	•	•	•	•	•	•	•	•	•	•	•	Q	1
Slovakia						•	•	•	•	•	•	•	•	•	R2	•	•	•	•	•	•	1
Spain	•	•	•	2nd	•	R1	3rd	R1	R1	2nd	•	2nd	3rd	•	•	•	2nd	QF	QF	•	Q	12
Sweden	•	•	•	•	•	•	•	•	•	•	•	•	•	•	3rd	•	•	•	•	•	•	1
Switzerland	•	•	•	•	•	•	•	•	•	•	•	•	1st	•	•	•	•	•	•	QF	•	2
Turkey	•	•	•	•	•	•	•	•	•	•	4th	•	QF	•	•	•	R1	•	•	•	•	3
Total (27 teams)	3	3	3	3	3	3	3	3	3	3	3	5	6	6	6	6	5	5	5	11	11	

=== FIFA U-17 Women's World Cup ===
FIFA U-17 Women's World Cup record
Team	2008 (New Zealand) (16)	2010 (Trinidad and Tobago) (16)	2012 (Azerbaijan) (16)	2014 (Costa Rica) (16)	2016 (Jordan) (16)	2018 (Uruguay) (16)	2022 (India) (16)	2024 (Dominican Republic) (16)	2025 (Morocco) (24)	2026 (Morocco) (24)	Years
Azerbaijan	•	•	R1	•	•	•	•	•	•	•	1
Denmark	QF	•	•	•	•	•	•	•	•	•	1
England	4th	•	•	•	QF	•	•	4th	•	•	3
Finland	•	•	•	•	•	R1	•	•	•	•	1
France	R1	•	1st	•	•	•	R1	•	QF	R2	5
Germany	3rd	QF	4th	R1	QF	QF	4th	•	•	R2	8
Italy	•	•	•	3rd	•	•	•	•	QF	•	2
Netherlands	•	•	•	•	•	•	•	•	2nd	•	1
Norway	•	•	•	•	•	•	•	•	R1	R1	2
Poland	•	•	•	•	•	•	•	QF	•	R2	2
Republic of Ireland	•	QF	•	•	•	•	•	•	•	•	1
Spain	•	3rd	•	2nd	3rd	1st	1st	2nd	R2	R2	8
Total (12 teams)	4	3	3	3	3	3	3	3	5	5	35

=== FIFA Futsal World Cup ===
FIFA Futsal World Cup record
Team	1989 (Netherlands) (16)	1992 (Hong Kong) (16)	1996 (Spain) (16)	2000 (Guatemala) (16)	2004 (Taiwan) (16)	2008 (Brazil) (20)	2012 (Thailand) (24)	2016 (Colombia) (24)	2021 (Lithuania) (24)	2024 (Uzbekistan) (24)	Years
Azerbaijan								QF			1
Belgium	4th	R2	R2								3
Croatia				R2						R2	2
Czech Republic					R2	R1	R2		R2		4
Denmark	R1										1
France										4th	1
Hungary	R2										1
Italy	R2	R1	R2		2nd	3rd	3rd	R2			7
Kazakhstan				R1				R2	4th	QF	4
Lithuania									R1		1
Netherlands	2nd	R2	R2	R2						R2	5
Poland		R2									1
Portugal				3rd	R2	R1	QF	4th	1st	R2	7
Russia		R1	3rd	4th		4th	QF	2nd	QF		7
Serbia							R2		R2		2
Spain	R1	3rd	2nd	1st	1st	2nd	2nd	QF	QF	R2	10
Ukraine			4th		R2	R2	QF	R2		3rd	6
Total (17 teams)	6	6	6	6	5	6	7	7	7	7	63

=== FIFA Beach Soccer World Cup ===
Team	Beach Soccer World Championship record										FIFA Beach Soccer World Cup record													Appearances		
Team	1995 (Brazil) (8)	1996 (Brazil) (8)	1997 (Brazil) (8)	1998 (Brazil) (10)	1999 (Brazil) (12)	2000 (Brazil) (12)	2001 (Brazil) (12)	2002 (Brazil) (8)	2003 (Brazil) (8)	2004 (Brazil) (12)	2005 (Brazil) (12)	2006 (Brazil) (16)	2007 (Brazil) (16)	2008 (France) (16)	2009 (United Arab Emirates) (16)	2011 (Italy) (16)	2013 (French Polynesia) (16)	2015 (Portugal) (16)	2017 (The Bahamas) (16)	2019 (Paraguay) (16)	2021 (Russia) (16)	2024 (United Arab Emirates) (16)	2025 (Seychelles) (16)	WC /10	FIFA /13	Years /23
Belarus	•	•	•	•	•	•	•	•	•	•	×	×	×	•	•	•	•	•	•	R1; 11th	R1; 14th	4th	2nd	0	4	4
Belgium	•	•	•	•	•	•	•	•	•	R1; 12th	•	•	×	×	•	×	×	×	×	×	×	×	•	1	0	1
Denmark	•	R1; 6th	•	•	•	•	•	•	•	•	×	×	×	×	×	×	×	×	•	×	•	•	•	1	0	1
England	3rd	•	•	•	•	•	•	•	•	•	•	•	•	•	•	•	•	•	•	×	•	×	•	1	0	1
France	•	•	R1; 7th	2nd	R1; 11th	R1; 11th	2nd	R1; 7th	4th	QF; 5th	1st	3rd	4th	QF; 8th	•	•	•	•	•	•	•	•	•	8	4	12
Germany	R1; 5th	•	•	•	•	R1; 12th	R1; 12th	•	•	R1; 11th	•	•	•	•	•	•	•	•	•	•	•	•	•	4	0	4
Italy	4th	3rd	R1; 5th	R1; 10th	R1; 9th	QF; 8th	QF; 8th	R1; 6th	R1; 6th	4th	•	R1; 15th	R1; 10th	2nd	QF; 8th	QF; 5th	•	4th	4th	2nd	•	2nd	QF	10	10	20
Netherlands	R1; 8th	•	•	•	•	•	•	•	•	•	•	•	×	•	•	•	R1; 14th	×	•	×	×	×	×	1	1	2
Poland	•	•	•	•	•	•	•	•	•	•	•	R1; 11th	•	•	•	•	•	•	R1; 15th	•	•	•	•	0	2	2
Portugal	•	•	R1; 6th	R1; 5th	2nd	QF; 6th	1st	2nd	3rd	3rd	2nd	4th	QF; 8th	3rd	3rd	3rd	•	1st	QF; 8th	1st	R1; 10th	QF; 5th	3rd	8	12	20
Russia	•	R1; 5th	•	•	•	•	•	•	•	•	×	•	R1; 9th	QF; 6th	QF; 7th	1st	1st	3rd	•	3rd	1st	×	×	1	8	9
Spain	•	•	•	R1; 6th	QF; 5th	3rd	QF; 6th	R1; 6th	2nd	2nd	QF; 7th	R1; 10th	QF; 7th	4th	QF; 6th	•	2nd	R1; 10th	•	•	QF; 7th	R1; 13th	QF	7	10	17
Switzerland	•	•	•	•	•	•	•	•	•	QF; 8th	•	•	•	•	2nd	R1; 10th	•	QF; 8th	QF; 5th	QF; 8th	3rd	•	•	1	6	7
Turkey	•	•	•	•	•	•	R1; 10th	•	•	•	•	×	•	×	•	•	•	•	•	•	•	•	×	1	0	1
Ukraine	•	•	•	•	•	•	•	•	•	•	QF; 6th	•	•	•	•	R1; 9th	R1; 12th	•	•	×	×	×	•	0	3	3
Total (15 teams)	4	3	3	4	4	5	6	4	4	7	4	5	5	5	5	5	4	5	4	5	5	4	4			

=== Former tournaments ===
==== FIFA Confederations Cup ====
FIFA Confederations Cup record
Team	1992 (Saudi Arabia) (4)	1995 (Saudi Arabia) (6)	1997 (Saudi Arabia) (8)	1999 (Mexico) (8)	2001 (South Korea) (Japan) (8)	2003 (France) (8)	2005 (Germany) (8)	2009 (South Africa) (8)	2013 (Brazil) (8)	2017 (Russia) (8)	Years
Czech Republic	×	•	3rd	•	•	•	•	•	•	•	1
Denmark	×	1st	•	•	•	•	•	•	•	•	1
France	×	•	•	••	1st	1st	•	•	•	•	2
Germany	×	•	••	GS	•	••	3rd	•	•	1st	3
Greece	×	•	•	•	•	•	GS	•	•	•	1
Italy	×	•	•	•	•	••	•	GS	3rd	•	2
Portugal	×	•	•	•	•	•	•	•	•	3rd	1
Russia	×	•	•	•	•	•	•	•	•	GS	1
Spain	×	•	•	•	•	••	•	3rd	2nd	•	2
Turkey	×	•	•	•	•	3rd	•	•	•	•	1
Total (10 teams)	0	1	1	1	1	2	2	2	2	3	15

== Sanctions ==
=== Against associations ===
- Lithuania, in 1990 sanctions were imposed due to the secession of the Lithuanian Football Federation from the Football Federation of the Soviet Union
- (Federal Republic of Yugoslavia) FR Yugoslavia, in 1992–1998 sanctions were imposed due to the Bosnian War (as part of the Yugoslav Wars)
- Russia, in 2022 sanctions were imposed due to the 2022 Russian invasion of Ukraine.
- Belarus, in 2022 sanctions were imposed due to supporting Russia in its invasion of Ukraine.

=== Against clubs ===
- Albania, in 1967 special sanctions were imposed against 1966–67 Albanian Superliga due to its political background
- England, in 1985–1991 sanctions were imposed against English association football clubs due to the Heysel Stadium disaster by suspending their participation in continental competitions for five years
- Italy, in 1974–1975 sanctions were imposed against SS Lazio due to its fans, Italy was restricted from the European Cup to which Lazio qualified
- Netherlands, in 1990–1991 sanctions were imposed against AFC Ajax due to its fans, the Netherlands were restricted from the European Cup to which Ajax qualified

== Corruption and controversy ==
Dissatisfied fans across Europe have referred to the organisation as UEFA mafia, including in Russia's top league, in Bulgaria's top league, and in a Champions League group stage match held in Sweden. The term has also been covered for its use outside of stadiums, for example during a protest in Kosovo outside an EU building following the Serbia v Albania (UEFA Euro 2016 qualifying) match. F.C. Copenhagen supporters displayed banners around the city, with slogans such as "UEFA MAFIA – THE PANDEMIC OF FOOTBALL", when UEFA ordered their 2019–20 Europa League round of 16 return leg be played behind closed doors, despite reduced capacity being allowed by the Danish government.

Following the 2015 FIFA corruption case, the then-president of UEFA, Michel Platini, was also involved in the case. Swiss prosecutors accused FIFA president Sepp Blatter of making a "disloyal payment" of $2m (£1.6m) to Mr Platini. Swiss attorney general, Michael Lauber, stated: "We didn't interview Mr Platini as a witness, that's not true. We investigated against him in between as a witness and an accused person". Both Platini and Sepp Blatter were banned from football-related activity. Platini appealed to Court of Arbitration for Sports, which lowered the six-year ban to four years. He further appealed to Swiss courts and the European Court of Human Rights but the courts rejected his appeals.

In 2019 UEFA's decision to host Europa League Cup final in Baku, Azerbaijan left one of the finalists, Arsenal, with a decision to withdraw their Armenian player Henrikh Mkhitaryan out of the competition due to safety concerns, and there has been long-standing debates about the extent to which the elite clubs or UEFA itself should exert the most influence on the game. UEFA's decision to partner with blockchain company Chiliz in February 2022 was criticised and described as 'incomprehensible' by fan groups across Europe.

In July 2025, UEFA sanctioned Crystal Palace F.C. and Olympique Lyonnais for breaching its multi-club ownership rules, due to overlapping ownership by John Textor's Eagle Football Group. Palace, who had qualified for the UEFA Europa League as FA Cup winners, were instead placed in the UEFA Europa Conference League, while Lyon retained the Europa League spot. The Court of Arbitration for Sport rejected Palace's appeal in August 2025.

In July 2026, UEFA made multiple public statements regarding FIFA President Gianni Infantino's proposal to create a $20 billion commercial subsidiary, the FIFA Forward Enterprise, which would be involved with the running of FIFA's major tournaments such as the FIFA World Cup, FIFA Women's World Cup, FIFA Club World Cup, and other tournaments. UEFA initially rejected it completely, calling upon FIFA to stop these plans and to not inject private money into its competitions. The situation escalated on 30 July, when UEFA released a statement in conjunction with all 55 member associations after a vote to boycott all FIFA competitions indefinitely until the commercialisation plans were stopped and assurances were made that they would never be brought up in the future.

In August 2026, UEFA began preparing a criminal complaint against Infantino in Switzerland for financial mismanagement. Requests for discovery were also filed in Manhattan for potential evidence from Thrive Capital Management, the would-be primary investors, and southern Florida, where FIFA has offices.

== See also ==
=== Resolutions ===
Awards:

- The UEFA Plaque
- UEFA Club Football Awards
- UEFA Men's Player of the Year Award
- UEFA Women's Player of the Year Award
- UEFA President's Award
- UEFA Team of the Year
- UEFA Jubilee Awards
- UEFA Golden Jubilee Poll
- UEFA Euro Teams of the Tournament
- UEFA EqualGame Award

Qualifications:

- UEFA coefficient
- UEFA Fair Play ranking
- UEFA stadium categories

Match:

- UEFA competitions
- UEFA Celebration Match

=== UEFA congress ===
- UEFA Congress

=== Financial fair play ===
- UEFA Financial Fair Play Regulations

=== UEFA coefficient ===
- UEFA coefficient

=== UEFA presidents ===
- List of presidents of UEFA

=== Related links ===
- List of association football clubs playing in the league of another country
- Timeline of football
- List of association football competitions
- International Federation of Association Football (FIFA)
- Asian Football Confederation (AFC)
- Confederation of African Football (CAF)
- Confederation of North, Central American and Caribbean Association Football (CONCACAF)
- Confederation of South American Football (CONMEBOL)
- Oceania Football Confederation (OFC)

=== Planned competitions ===
- Proposals for a European Super League in association football – A project for a sole pan-European Football League which UEFA executives have been involved in
