= Artemio Franchi =

Italian football administrator (1922–1983)

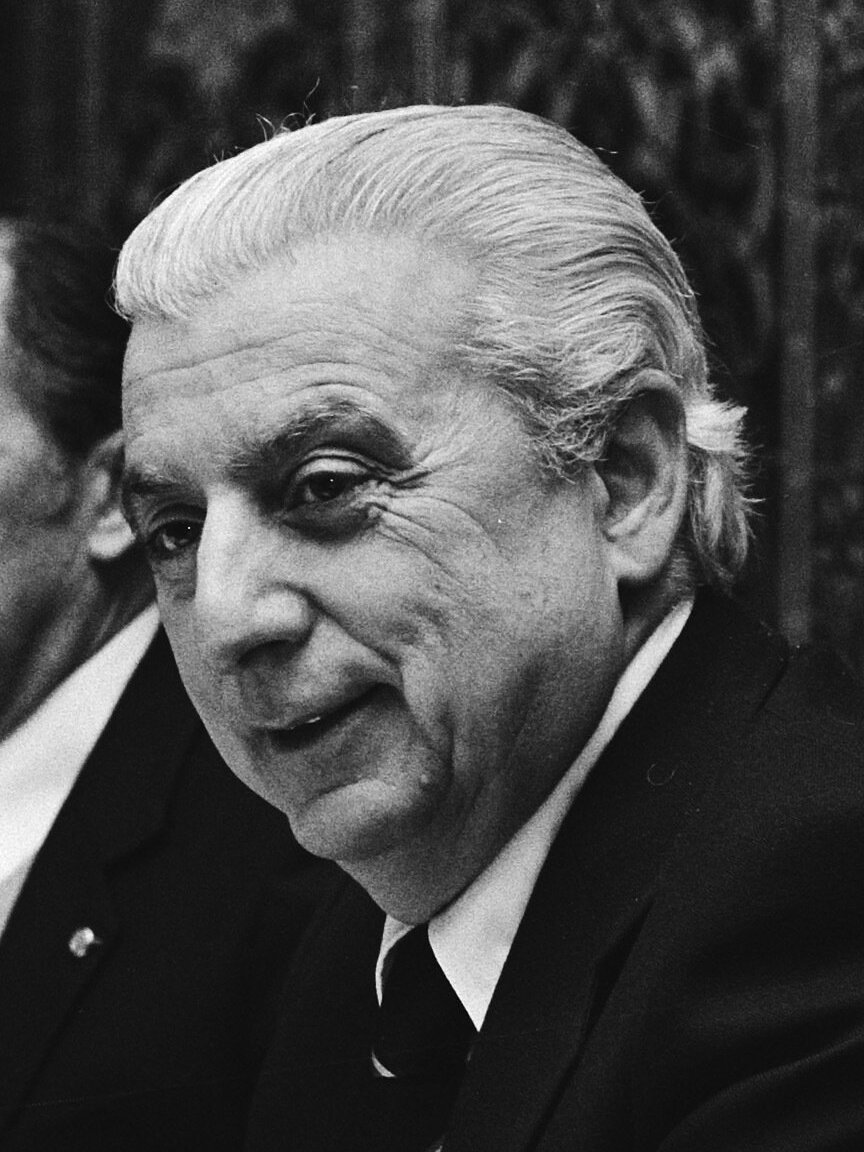
- Franchi in 1979

3rd President of UEFA
- In office 15 March 1973 – 12 August 1983
- Preceded by: Sándor Barcs (acting)
- Succeeded by: Jacques Georges

Personal details
- Born: 8 January 1922 Florence, Italy
- Died: 12 August 1983 (aged 61) Siena, Italy
- Occupation: Football administrator

Artemio Franchi (Italian pronunciation: [arˈtɛːmjo ˈfraŋki]; 8 January 1922 – 12 August 1983) was an Italian football administrator.

== Biography ==
He served as President of the Italian Football Federation (1967–1976, 1978–1980), president of the UEFA (1973–1983), and member of the FIFA Executive Committee (1974–1983).

Franchi's name appeared on the Propaganda Due's list of members, but he denied being a part of the organization. He died in a road accident near Siena on 12 August 1983.

The home stadium of ACF Fiorentina and that of A.C. Siena are both named in his honour, as well as the Artemio Franchi Trophy. In 2011, he was posthumously inducted into the Italian Football Hall of Fame.

| Preceded by Sándor Barcs (Acting) | President of UEFA; 1973–1983 | Succeeded by Jacques Georges |
