= Ebbe Schwartz =

Danish football administrator (1901–1964)

1st President of UEFA
- In office 22 June 1954 – 17 April 1962
- Preceded by: Office created
- Succeeded by: Gustav Wiederkehr

Personal details
- Born: 3 May 1901 Frederiksberg, Denmark
- Died: 19 October 1964 (aged 63) Honolulu, Hawaii, United States
- Occupation: Football administrator

Ebbe Schwartz (3 May 1901 – 19 October 1964) was a Danish football administrator.

== Career ==
- From 1950 until 1964 he was president of the Danish Football Association (DBU).
- He served as the first UEFA president (1954–1962).
- From 1962 until 1964 he was a member of the executive committee and vice-president of the world football federation FIFA.

Preceded by Office created	President of UEFA; 1954–1962	Succeeded by Gustav Wiederkehr
