= Gustav Wiederkehr =

Swiss UEFA President (1905–1972)

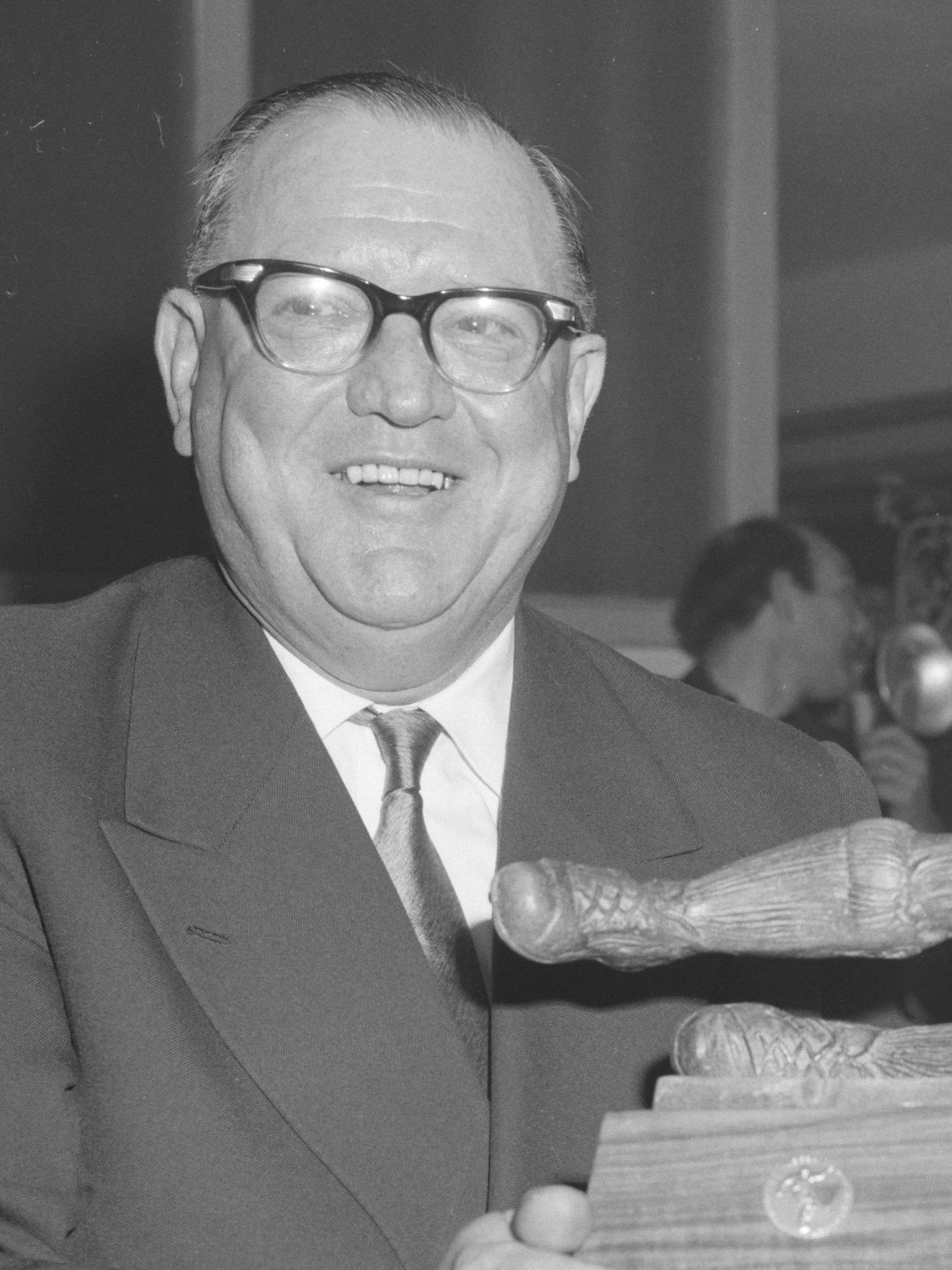
- Wiederkehr in 1962

2nd President of UEFA
- In office 17 April 1962 – 7 July 1972
- Preceded by: Ebbe Schwartz
- Succeeded by: Sándor Barcs (Acting)

Personal details
- Born: 2 October 1905 Zürich, Switzerland
- Died: 7 July 1972 (aged 66) Zürich, Switzerland
- Occupation: Football administrator

Gustav Max Wiederkehr (2 October 1905 – 7 July 1972) was a Swiss football administrator. He served as the president of UEFA from 1962 to 1972.

Preceded by Ebbe Schwartz	President of UEFA; 1962–1972	Succeeded by Sándor Barcs (Acting)
