= List of presidents of UEFA =

President of UEFA

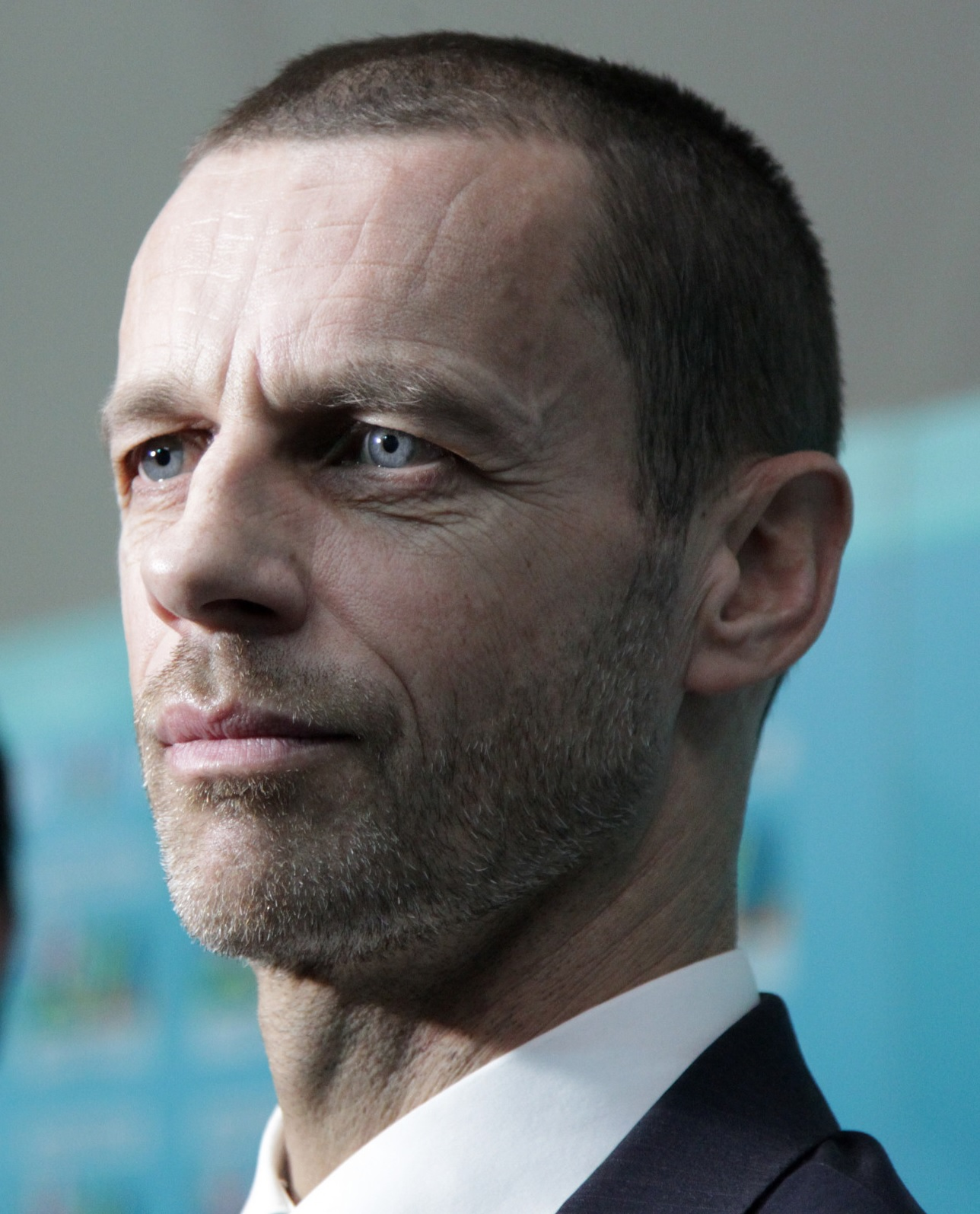
- Incumbent; Aleksander Čeferin since 14 September 2016
- UEFA
- Appointer: UEFA Congress
- Term length: Four years; renewable
- Formation: 22 June 1954
- First holder: Ebbe Schwartz
- Succession: First vice-president
- Website: Official website

The following is a list of presidents of UEFA, the European association football governing body.

== Presidents of UEFA ==
No.	Portrait	Name (born–died)	Term of office			Country	Ref.
No.	Portrait	Name (born–died)	Took office	Left office	Time in office	Country	Ref.
1		Ebbe Schwartz (1901–1964)	22 June 1954	17 April 1962	7 years, 299 days	Denmark	
2		Gustav Wiederkehr (1905–1972)	17 April 1962	7 July 1972 †	10 years, 76 days	Switzerland	
–		Sándor Barcs (1912–2010) acting	7 July 1972	15 March 1973	251 days	Hungary	
3		Artemio Franchi (1922–1983)	15 March 1973	12 August 1983 †	10 years, 150 days	Italy	
4		Jacques Georges (1916–2004)	12 August 1983	19 April 1990	6 years, 250 days	France	
5		Lennart Johansson (1929–2019)	19 April 1990	26 January 2007	16 years, 282 days	Sweden	
6		Michel Platini (1955–)	26 January 2007	8 October 2015 (Note: Date of suspension; Banned for 6 years on 21 December 2015.)	8 years, 255 days	France	
–		Ángel María Villar (1950–) acting	9 October 2015	14 September 2016	341 days	Spain	
7		Aleksander Čeferin (1967–)	14 September 2016	Incumbent	10 years, 42 days	Slovenia	

Notes

- Jacques Georges served as interim president before being elected on 26 June 1984.
- The title of Honorary President was conferred to Jacques Georges upon leaving office until his death in 2004.
- The title of Honorary President was conferred to Lennart Johansson upon leaving office until his death in 2019.

== See also ==
- List of association football competitions
- List of presidents of FIFA
- List of presidents of AFC
- List of presidents of CAF
- List of presidents of CONCACAF
- List of presidents of CONMEBOL
- List of presidents of OFC
