= Jacques Georges =

Previous UEFA president

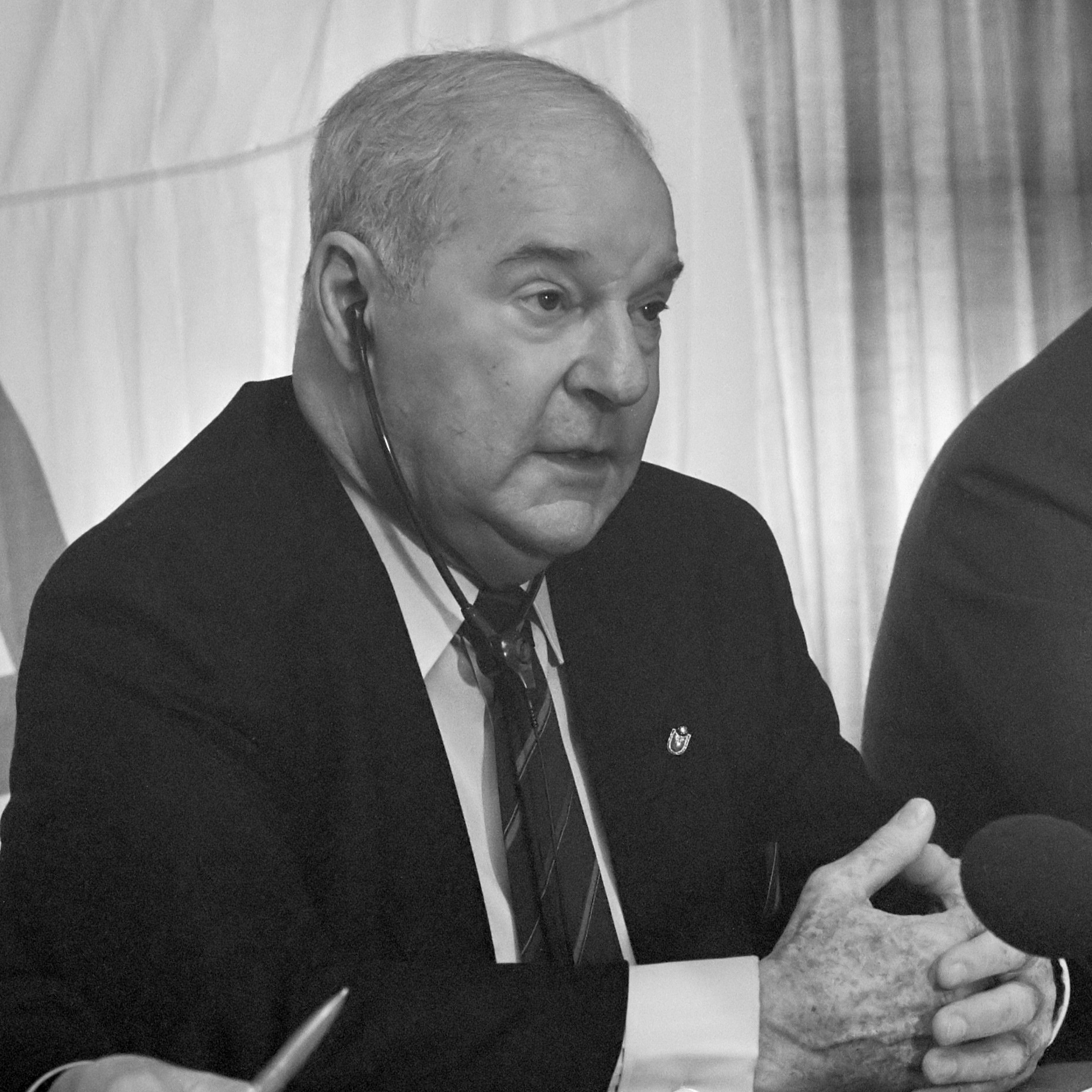
- Georges in 1987

President of the French Football Federation
- In office 1968–1972
- Preceded by: Antoine Chiarisoli
- Succeeded by: Fernand Sastre

4th President of UEFA
- In office 26 June 1984 – 19 April 1990; Acting: 12 August 1983 – 26 June 1984
- Preceded by: Artemio Franchi
- Succeeded by: Lennart Johansson

Personal details
- Born: 30 May 1916 Saint-Maurice-sur-Moselle, France
- Died: 25 February 2004 (aged 87) Saint-Maurice-sur-Moselle, France
- Education: HEC Paris

Jacques Georges (30 May 1916 – 25 February 2004) was the president of the French Football Federation (FFF) from 1968 until 1972 and the 4th president of UEFA (1983–1990).

== Biography ==
In April 1989, he caused controversy by describing a minority of Liverpool F.C. supporters as "beasts", wrongly believing that hooliganism was the cause of the Hillsborough disaster which ultimately resulted in the deaths of 97 of the English club's fans. He issued a swift apology for his comments upon discovering that hooliganism did not cause the tragedy.

He died in February 2004 at the age of 88.

Georges was a graduate of HEC Paris.

Preceded by Artemio Franchi	President of UEFA; 1983–1990	Succeeded by Lennart Johansson
