= Aleksander Čeferin =

Slovenian lawyer and football administrator

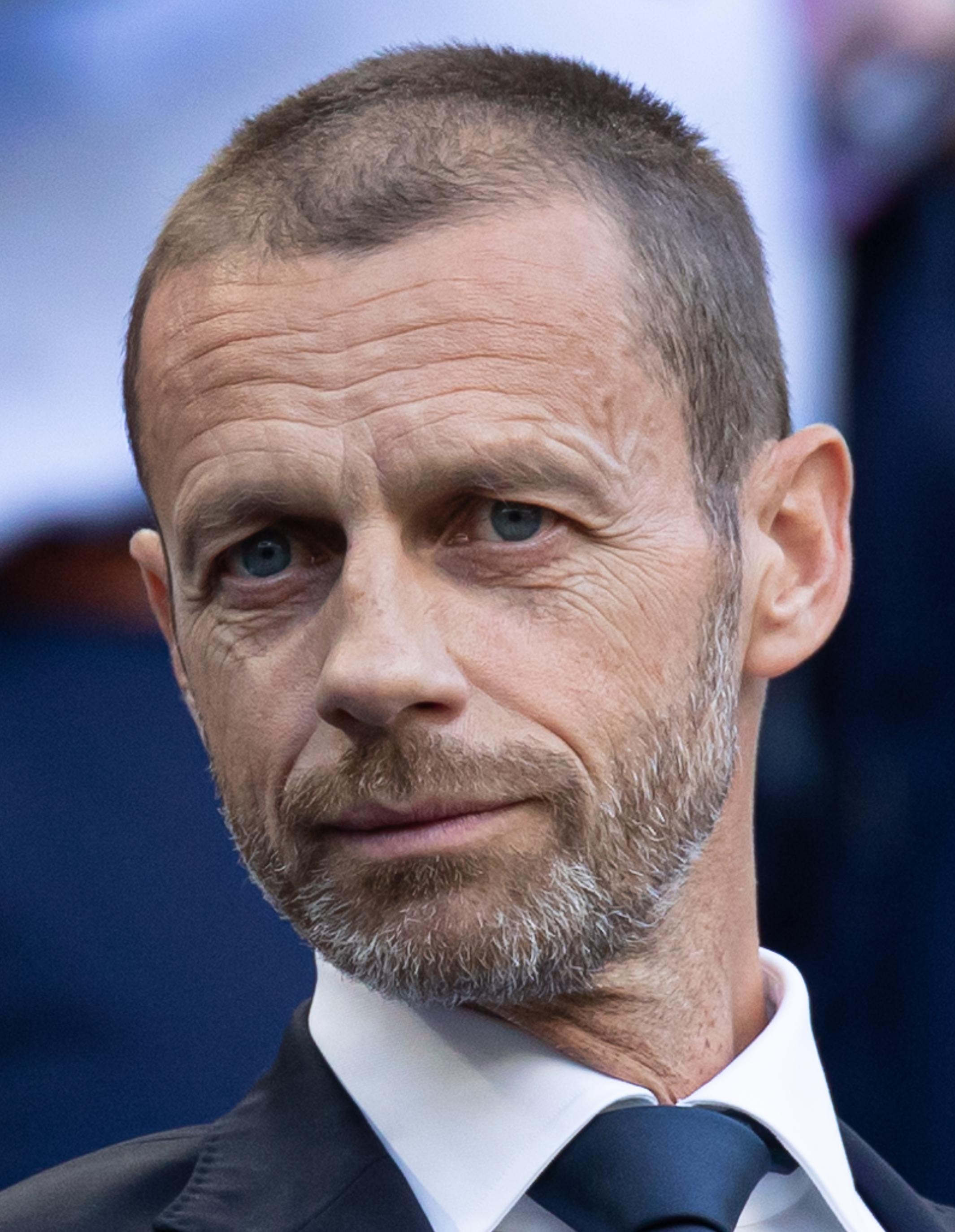
- Čeferin in 2019

7th President of UEFA
- Incumbent
- Assumed office 14 September 2016
- Preceded by: Michel Platini; Ángel María Villar (Acting)

17th President of the Football Association of Slovenia
- In office 2011–2016
- Preceded by: Ivan Simič
- Succeeded by: Radenko Mijatović

Personal details
- Born: 13 October 1967 (age 59) Ljubljana, SR Slovenia, Yugoslavia (now Slovenia)
- Parent: Peter Čeferin (father)
- Education: University of Ljubljana
- Occupation: Lawyer

Aleksander Čeferin (pronounced [alɛˈksaːndəɾ tʃɛfɛˈɾiːn]; born 13 October 1967) is a Slovenian lawyer and football administrator. Between 2011 and 2016, he was president of the Football Association of Slovenia. Since September 2016, he has been the president of UEFA.

== Early career ==
After graduating from the University of Ljubljana's law faculty, Čeferin went to work for his family's law firm, developing a special interest in representing professional athletes and sports clubs. He later took over from his father as company director. His brother Rok is currently the President of the Constitutional Court of the Republic of Slovenia, to which he was initially elected as a judge in 2019. His sister Petra is an architect and a professor in the Faculty of Architecture at the University of Ljubljana.

=== Administrative roles ===
In 2005, Čeferin took a formal interest in local football through his work with the executive board of futsal club FC Litija. A member of the executive committee of amateur side FC Ljubljana Lawyers since 2005, he served as a member at NK Olimpija Ljubljana from 2006 to 2011. In 2011, Čeferin was elected president of the Football Association of Slovenia. He also served as a second and third vice-chairman of the UEFA Legal Committee from 2011 to 2016.

== President of UEFA ==
=== First election ===
On 14 September 2016, Čeferin was elected the seventh president of UEFA, automatically becoming a vice-president of FIFA in the process. He polled 42 votes at the Extraordinary UEFA Congress in Athens, beating Dutchman Michael van Praag, who received 13 votes. Čeferin's presidential manifesto and campaign centred on the need for UEFA to adopt good governance reforms and his proposals were approved in April 2017 by the 41st Ordinary UEFA Congress in Helsinki. These reforms included the introduction of term limits for UEFA presidents and UEFA Executive Committee members and the provision that Executive Committee candidates must hold an active office (president, vice-president, general secretary, or CEO) with their national association.

=== Work during first term ===
One of Čeferin's initial priorities was to work on ways to improve competitive balance in European football and to reduce the gap between the elite clubs and the rest. A series of meetings were held at the UEFA headquarters in Nyon with key stakeholders to align on a strategy and to explore options available. Čeferin pledged to strengthen the UEFA Financial Fair Play Regulations (FFPR) measures put in place in 2009, and supervised amendments to the regulations for the new competition cycle 2018–21. Thanks to the FFPR, European clubs reported €600 million in profits in 2017, compared to the €1,700 million combined losses in 2011.

Other statutory changes approved at the congress in Helsinki included the strengthening of the UEFA Governance and Compliance Committee with two additional independent members, and the granting of two full member positions on the UEFA Executive Committee to representatives of the European Club Association (ECA). A representative of the European Professional Football Leagues (EPFL) was later also added to the UEFA Executive Committee in February 2018 at the 42nd Ordinary UEFA Congress in Bratislava.

As part of his objective to consolidate communication and collaboration with key football stakeholders, Čeferin worked to strengthen ties with members of the European Parliament, the Council of Europe, and the European Commission. Investment in grassroots and women's association football has also been at the core of Čeferin's mandate. While record grants for the development of football were announced at the 42nd UEFA Ordinary Congress in February 2018, UEFA also pledged to increase the funding of women's football development projects by 50% in October 2018. He also oversaw the signing of UEFA's first-ever sponsorship deal dedicated entirely to women's football in December 2018.

=== Second election ===
On 7 February 2019, Čeferin was re-elected by acclamation for a new four-year term at the 43rd Ordinary UEFA Congress in Rome. During his acceptance speech, he reinforced a message of unity to ensure that "European football remains united, that European football remains respectful, respectable and respected, and that European football continues to demonstrate solidarity and bring hope."

=== Work during second term ===
When the 2019–20 football season was interrupted due to the COVID-19 pandemic, UEFA was still able to conclude all of its senior club competitions under the stewardship of Čeferin, as final-eight tournaments were successfully held for the Champions League, Europa League, and Women's Champions League in Portugal, Germany, and Spain, respectively.

Čeferin always refused the creation of an independent Super League and guaranteed it would never happen on his watch, which led to clashes with FIFA president Gianni Infantino. On 19 April 2021, after the European Super League proposal was publicised, Čeferin threatened potential sanctions on the participating members in a press conference in Montreux. On 20 April, Čeferin urged the owners and presidents of the breakaway clubs, especially the English ones, to change their minds. In his speech at the Ordinary 45th UEFA Congress, he said: "Gentlemen, you made a huge mistake. Some will say it is greed, others disdain, arrogance, flippancy or complete ignorance of England's football culture. It does not matter. What does matter is that there is still time to change your mind. Everyone makes mistakes." Following Čeferin's appeal and a number of public protests by football fans in the United Kingdom, most clubs involved in the Super League turned their backs on the project, as it collapsed three days after it had been announced.

In October 2021, Čeferin opposed FIFA's proposal for a biennial FIFA World Cup, warning it could have "terrible consequences" for football and deepen tensions between UEFA and FIFA over the sport's future direction.

Čeferin has also advocated reforms to UEFA competitions, overseeing the introduction of the UEFA Nations League, the UEFA Europa Conference League and the expanded UEFA Champions League format from 2024–25, arguing that the changes would increase competitiveness, provide greater opportunities for clubs from smaller associations and generate additional revenue for European football.

==== Position on 2022 Russian invasion of Ukraine ====
Čeferin strongly condemned the 2022 Russian invasion of Ukraine, banning Russia from UEFA competitions until further notice. He quickly removed St. Petersburg as the host city of the 2022 UEFA Champions League final.

Čeferin expressed, however, that until further notice he "sees no reason to remove" its key ally Belarus from international football.

=== Third election ===
On 5 April 2023, the 47th UEFA Congress, held in Lisbon, unanimously re-elected Čeferin as UEFA President for the period 2023–27. In his acceptance speech, the president thanked delegates for their support. "It is a great honour but mainly it is a great responsibility towards ... football." Čeferin then echoed the pledge that he delivered after his first election in Athens: "I promise you that I will never forget that we are here because of football. We will put football first, always. I will do whatever I can to protect football together with you."

In January 2024, proposed amendments to UEFA's presidential term-limit rules sparked controversy and led to the resignation of UEFA Chief of Football Zvonimir Boban, who described the changes as "fatal" and contrary to his principles. Čeferin defended the amendments as a legal clarification to be decided by the UEFA Congress.

=== Work during third term ===
Čeferin "prioritised placing football first" when UEFA announced the creation of a new Football Board. The advisory body, approved by the UEFA Executive Committee at its last meeting in Lisbon, is designed to give an institutional yet independent voice of experience and expertise on fundamental football-related topics, including the Laws of the Game, refereeing, match calendar, elite youth development and players well-being. Members of the board include Zinedine Zidane, José Mourinho, Carlo Ancelotti, Paolo Maldini, Gareth Southgate and Gareth Bale.

In August 2023, Čeferin criticized Saudi Arabia's recruitment of ageing star players, comparing the strategy to China's unsuccessful football spending in the late 2010s, and argued that investment should instead focus on youth development and infrastructure. In January 2024, he defended UEFA's 2020 sanctions against Manchester City over alleged Financial Fair Play breaches, stating that UEFA had been "right" in its decision and expressing confidence in the ruling of its independent body. He acknowledged that the Court of Arbitration for Sport had overturned Manchester City's two-year ban, but said that, as a former trial lawyer, court decisions must be respected even when one disagrees with the outcome. Manchester City manager Pep Guardiola responded by saying that Čeferin, as a lawyer and UEFA president, should "respect the process" and wait until the Premier League's ongoing case against the club had concluded before commenting publicly.

In April 2025, Čeferin criticized a proposal to expand the 2030 FIFA World Cup to 64 teams, calling it "a bad idea" and arguing that it would harm both the tournament and UEFA's qualifying process. He also said he was surprised by the proposal, stating that FIFA Council members had not been informed of it beforehand.

In October 2025, Čeferin warned that European leagues playing matches abroad could "break football", though he had approved a December 2025 La Liga match between Villarreal and Barcelona to be played in Miami and a February 2026 Serie A match between AC Milan and Como 1907 to be played in Perth. The Miami match was cancelled due to significant fan and player backlash.

In June 2026, Čeferin announced the appointment of Somali official Omar Artan to referee the 2026 UEFA Super Cup, which was held in Salzburg, Austria on 12 August 2026. Made within the framework of a Memorandum of Understanding (MoU) between UEFA and the Confederation of African Football (CAF), Artan became the first non-European referee to oversee a major UEFA competition match. The decision followed controversy earlier that month when Artan was denied entry to the United States, despite having been selected by FIFA to referee at the 2026 FIFA World Cup. In justifying the appointment, Čeferin stated that "football is made to connect people" and that UEFA wanted to show respect to Artan's outstanding officiating skills. Čeferin attended the match alongside CAF President Patrice Motsepe to show solidarity with Artan and awarded him and the other match officials medals.

In July 2026, Čeferin did not attend the 2026 FIFA World Cup final in the United States, reportedly in protest over FIFA's handling of the Balogun red card controversy, which further reflected strained relations between UEFA and FIFA over football governance. Upon the conclusion of the tournament, UEFA rejected FIFA's proposed sale of stakes in FIFA Forward Enterprise (FFE), with Čeferin and UEFA member associations threatening to boycott FIFA competitions, including the FIFA World Cup, over concerns regarding governance, consultation, and private control of football's commercial future. UEFA's 55 member associations unanimously backed the boycott position, demanding assurances that FIFA would not open its governance or competitions to private ownership. The proposal later collapsed amid widespread opposition from football stakeholders. Former UEFA president Michel Platini reportedly congratulated Čeferin over the confederation's threat to boycott FIFA competitions in opposition to Infantino's commercial plans.

== Philanthropy ==
Čeferin was elected chairman of the UEFA Foundation for Children in November 2017, taking over from former European Commission president José Manuel Barroso. The UEFA Foundation for Children supports humanitarian projects around the world linked to children's rights in areas such as health, education and integration.

Also in November 2017, Čeferin joined the football-led charity movement Common Goal, pledging to give 1% of his salary to the organization's charity projects. About the movement, Čeferin said: "I firmly believe that football has the power to change the world and I was inspired by Juan Mata to join the Common Goal movement. I call upon everyone in the football family – players, coaches, clubs and leagues – to show they care about social responsibility and donate to causes that they believe in."

In March 2022, the members of the board of trustees of the UEFA Foundation for Children and its chairman, Aleksander Čeferin, allocated the 2022 UEFA Foundation Award of €1 million to help children in Ukraine as well as child refugees in neighbouring countries as a result of the war which erupted in the region.

One year later, in February 2023, UEFA and its partner, the UEFA Foundation for Children, made an initial donation of €200,000 to support the vast humanitarian operation assisting victims of two devastating earthquakes in Türkiye and Syria.

== Honours ==
In 2016, Čeferin was voted sports personality of the year by the Slovenian sports newspaper Ekipa SN. This was the ninth edition of the award, which is voted on by newspaper journalists and readers. In January 2019, SportsPro Media included Čeferin in the exclusive list of most influential people in the sports industry. He was also selected as one of the people of the year by World Soccer in its first issue of 2019.

In September 2021, Čeferin was named "2021 Best Executive" by the World Football Summit (WFS) Awards, "in recognition of his exemplary leadership in combating the European Super League and delivering a hugely successful UEFA Euro 2020 tournament in the midst of a global pandemic". The WFS Awards judges acknowledged Čeferin's inspiring management role whilst UEFA faced a uniquely testing time for the organisation and the football world as a whole.

Čeferin's role in defeating the so-called European Super League and opposing a biennial World Cup was formally recognised in November 2021 when he was included on Politico's prestigious annual list of the most influential people in Europe.

In January 2022, Slovenian newspaper Delo declared UEFA president Aleksander Čeferin the Person of the Year for 2021 for "suppressing in a swift action the plan of the richest clubs to establish a super-league and thus destroy the European model of sport".

== Personal life ==
Čeferin is married to his wife Barbara and is a father of three girls. He is fluent in Slovenian, Croatian, Italian, and English. He grew up supporting Hajduk Split. Čeferin is a 4th Dan black belt in Shotokan Karate. He is also a motorsport aficionado and has crossed the Sahara Desert five times, four by car and once by motorcycle. As a teenager, Čeferin served in the Yugoslav People's Army in 1986 and later served as a Slovenian Territorial Defence soldier in the Slovenian War of Independence in 1991.

Civic offices
Preceded by Ángel María Villar (Acting)	President of UEFA; 2016–present	Incumbent
Sporting positions
Preceded by Ivan Simič	President of the Football Association of Slovenia; 2011–2016	Succeeded by Radenko Mijatović
