= UEFA Congress =

Supreme control body of UEFA

Arched version of the UEFA logo

The UEFA Congress (French: Congrès de l'UEFA, German: UEFA-Kongress) is the supreme controlling organ of the Union of European Football Associations (UEFA). UEFA is the administrative body for association football and futsal in Europe, and is one of six continental confederations of world football's governing body, the Fédération Internationale de Football Association (FIFA). UEFA consists of 55 member associations.

The congresses may be ordinary or extraordinary. Ordinary congresses meet annually, typically between February and May. An extraordinary congress may be convened by the UEFA Executive Committee, or at the written request of one fifth or more of the UEFA member associations, to deal with financial matters and/or matters of particular significance. Each of the 55 members of UEFA has one vote in the congress. The members of UEFA are responsible for electing the UEFA president and the members of the UEFA Executive Committee.

The most recent edition, the 50th Ordinary UEFA Congress, was held on 12 February 2026 in Brussels, Belgium. The next congress is scheduled to be held on 4 March 2027 in Astana, Kazakhstan.

== History ==
UEFA was founded on 15 June 1954 in Basel, Switzerland, and began with 31 members. The first congress was held the following year, on 2 March 1955 in Vienna, Austria. Until 1968, the meetings were known as general assemblies. The first extraordinary congress was held on 11 December 1959 in Paris, France. The most recent extraordinary congress was held on 20 September 2017 in Zurich, the 13th to take place. The ordinary congress was initially held annually up until 1958, when the delegates decided to amend the UEFA Statutes so the congress would follow a biennial schedule. Starting in 2003, the congress returned to an annual meeting, which was decided at the congress in 2002, mainly to facilitate the financial management of UEFA. On three occasions, two congress—an ordinary and extraordinary—have been held in the same year (in 1968, 2007 and 2017), while 2016 was the only year to see three congresses take place, due to two extraordinary meetings being held. The congress is typically held on a single day, though four congresses were held over two consecutive days: in 2000, 2004, 2007 and 2009.

All congresses have been held within a UEFA member association, except for the 4th Extraordinary UEFA Congress, which took place in Monte Carlo, Monaco. Italy has hosted both the most overall and ordinary congresses with seven, all taking placing in Rome, of which five were ordinary and two extraordinary. Switzerland has hosted the most extraordinary congresses with five, though Rome is tied with Geneva and Zurich for the most extraordinary congresses by city with two. Four cities have held both an ordinary and extraordinary congress: Helsinki, London, Paris and Rome. As of 2026, the 50 ordinary congresses have been held in 33 cities, while the 13 extraordinary congresses have been held in 10 cities, for a total of 63 congresses in 38 cities.

== Responsibilities ==
The following matters are within the power of the UEFA Congress:

- receipt and consideration of the annual report, financial report and the auditors' report
- approval of the annual accounts and budget
- election of the UEFA president
- election of UEFA Executive Committee members
- ratification of the Executive Committee members elected by the European Football Clubs and European Leagues
- election of the European members of the FIFA Council
- election of the auditing body
- amendments to the UEFA Statutes
- addition or removal of a member association
- decisions on the lifting or continuation of the suspension of a member association, UEFA Executive Committee member or a member of another body
- bestowal of honorary presidency or membership

== List of congresses ==
This colour background and the * symbol indicate that the congress elected the UEFA president.

=== Ordinary ===
Number	Date(s)	City
1 (I) *	2 March 1955	(Austria) Vienna
2 (II)	8 June 1956	(Portugal) Lisbon
3 (III)	28 June 1957	(Denmark) Copenhagen
4 (IV) *	4 June 1958	(Sweden) Stockholm
5 (V)	21 August 1960	(Italy) Rome
6 (VI) *	17 April 1962	(Bulgaria) Sofia
7 (VII)	17 June 1964	(Spain) Madrid
8 (VIII) *	6 July 1966	(England) London
9 (IX)	7 June 1968	(Italy) Rome
10 (X) *	8 May 1970	(Socialist Federal Republic of Yugoslavia) Dubrovnik
11 (XI)	7 June 1972	(Austria) Vienna
12 (XII) *	22 May 1974	(Scotland) Edinburgh
13 (XIII)	15 June 1976	(Sweden) Stockholm
14 (XIV) *	22 April 1978	(Turkey) Istanbul
15 (XV)	21 June 1980	(Italy) Rome
16 (XVI) *	28 April 1982	(East Germany) Dresden
17 (XVII) *	26 June 1984	(France) Paris
18 (XVIII) *	24 April 1986	(Portugal) Cascais
19 (XIX)	24 June 1988	(West Germany) Munich
20 (XX) *	19 April 1990	(Malta) St. Julian's
21 (XXI)	25 June 1992	(Sweden) Gothenburg
22 (XXII) *	28 April 1994	(Austria) Vienna
23 (XXIII)	29 June 1996	(England) London
24 (XXIV) *	30 April 1998	(Republic of Ireland) Dublin
25 (XXV)	30 June – 1 July 2000	Luxembourg City
26 (XXVI) *	25 April 2002	(Sweden) Stockholm
27 (XXVII)	27 March 2003	(Italy) Rome
28 (XXVIII)	22–23 April 2004	(Cyprus) Limassol
29 (XXIX)	21 April 2005	(Estonia) Tallinn
30 (XXX)	23 March 2006	(Hungary) Budapest
31 (XXXI) *	25–26 January 2007	(Germany) Düsseldorf
32 (XXXII)	31 January 2008	(Croatia) Zagreb
33 (XXXIII)	25–26 March 2009	(Denmark) Copenhagen
34 (XXXIV)	25 March 2010	(Israel) Tel Aviv
35 (XXXV) *	22 March 2011	(France) Paris
36 (XXXVI)	22 March 2012	(Turkey) Istanbul
37 (XXXVII)	24 May 2013	(England) London
38 (XXXVIII)	27 March 2014	(Kazakhstan) Astana
39 (XXXIX) *	24 March 2015	(Austria) Vienna
40 (XL)	3 May 2016	(Hungary) Budapest
41 (XLI)	5 April 2017	(Finland) Helsinki
42 (XLII)	26 February 2018	(Slovakia) Bratislava
43 (XLIII) *	7 February 2019	(Italy) Rome
44 (XLIV)	3 March 2020	(Netherlands) Amsterdam
45 (XLV)	20 April 2021 (Note: The 45th Ordinary UEFA Congress, originally scheduled for 2 March 2021 in Minsk, Belarus, was later moved to Switzerland due to the COVID-19 pandemic in Europe, and delayed until 20 April 2021.)	(Switzerland) Montreux
46 (XLVI)	11 May 2022	(Austria) Vienna
47 (XLVII) *	5 April 2023	(Portugal) Lisbon
48 (XLVIII)	8 February 2024	(France) Paris (Note: The 48th Ordinary UEFA Congress, originally to be held in Madrid, Spain, was later relocated to Paris.)
49 (XLIX)	3 April 2025	(Serbia) Belgrade
50 (L)	12 February 2026	(Belgium) Brussels
51 (LI) *	22 April 2027	(Kazakhstan) Astana

=== Extraordinary ===
Number	Date	City
1 (I)	11 December 1959	(France) Paris
2 (II)	27 September 1961	(England) London
3 (III)	7 June 1968	(Italy) Rome
4 (IV)	16 June 1971	(Monaco) Monte Carlo
5 (V) *	15 March 1973	(Italy) Rome
6 (VI)	19 September 1991	(Switzerland) Montreux
7 (VII)	17 June 1993	(Switzerland) Geneva
8 (VIII)	24 September 1997	(Finland) Helsinki
9 (IX)	11 October 2001	(Czech Republic) Prague
10 (X)	28 May 2007	(Switzerland) Zurich
11 (XI)	25 February 2016	(Switzerland) Zurich
12 (XII) *	14 September 2016	(Greece) Athens
13 (XIII)	20 September 2017	(Switzerland) Geneva

== See also ==
- List of presidents of UEFA
- FIFA Congress
