= Roullier =

Roullier is a surname. It is of French origins. Notable people with the surname include:

- Chase Roullier (born 1993), American football player
- Daniel Roullier (born 1935), French billionaire businessman
- Pierre Roullier (born 1954), French flautist and conductor

== See also ==
- Rollier
