= Rollier =

Rollier is a surname. Notable people with the surname include:

- Auguste Rollier (1874-1954), Swiss physician known for research on Heliotherapy
- Charles Rollier (1912–1968), Swiss painter
- Baptiste Rollier (born 1982), Swiss orienteering competitor.
- Francois Rollier (1915–1992), educated and when younger employed as a lawyer, joined the Michelin company in 1956
- Michel Rollier (born 1944), French industrialist in the automobile industry
