= Francois Rollier =

French businessman (1915–1992)

François Rollier
- Born: 1915
- Died: 1992 (aged 76–77)
- Occupations: Businessman, Lawyer
- Known for: Leadership at Michelin and Citroën
- Title: Chairman of Citroën (1970–1975), Director at Michelin (1966–1991)
- Children: Michel Rollier, Philippe Rollier

François Rollier (1915–1992) was a french lawyer and businessman. He was a key executive at the Michelin company from 1956, serving as a director between 1966 and 1991 alongside his cousin, François Michelin, and, from 1986, René Zingraff.

== Career ==
=== Michelin ===
Rollier joined Michelin in 1956 and played a crucial role in the company's expansion. By 1966, he became one of Michelin's leading directors, helping guide the company alongside François Michelin. He remained in this position until his retirement in 1991, after which Édouard Michelin succeeded him.

=== Citroën ===
On 24 June 1970, Rollier was appointed chairman of Citroën, a leading automobile manufacturer that had been financially struggling and was acquired by Michelin, its main creditor, in the 1930s. At the time of his appointment, Citroën had recently introduced the Citroën GS, a model seen as key to its financial recovery. However, the 1973 oil crisis severely impacted the company, leading to heavy losses. In 1975, Michelin ceded control of Citroën to Peugeot, forming PSA Peugeot Citroën.

== Personal life ==
François Rollier was the father of Michel Rollier, who served as a director and board member at Michelin from 2006 to 2021. His elder son, Philippe Rollier, was the CEO of Lafarge North America.
