= Bertrand Meheut =

French business executive (1951–2026)

- Born: 22 September 1951; Rennes, Ille-et-Vilaine, France
- Died: 18 November 2026 (aged 75)
- Education: École nationale supérieure des mines de Nancy; Lycée La fontaine des eaux
- Occupations: Business owner Businessman
- Years active: 1972–2026
- Employer(s): Transpac; Groupe Roullier; Aventis; Isoroy; Rhône-Poulenc; Canal+
- Known for: President of CNews (2004–2015); President of Canal+ (2003–2015)
- Awards: Manager of the Year (2006)

Bertrand Meheut (Note: Some sources, including some cited in this article, render his surname "Méheut". The variant without the accent is used here to conform with the spelling used on French Wikipedia (fr:WP).) (22 September 1951 – 18 November 2026) was a French business figure. He was president of Groupe Canal+ from 2002 to 2015.

== Biography ==
Meheut was surgeon Michel Meheut's son, and completed his secondary-school studies at the Collège Roger Vercel and then later at the Lycée La Fontaine des Eaux, both in Dinan. He was a civil mining engineer, having earned a diploma at the École nationale supérieure des mines de Nancy, graduating in 1972.

Meheut began his career at Transpac, a daughter company of France Télécom, where he directed the operation of the X25 data transmission network, a forerunner to the Internet. In 1984, he joined the Rhône-Poulenc group, where for twelve years he held various international positions, among which was notably one in Germany, namely general director of the group's subsidiary; eventually he was named vice-president and general director of the Europe branch.

In December 1995, Meheut took over the leadership of Isoroy. Then, in 1996, he took on the vice-presidency of Groupe Roullier (an agribusiness conglomerate) with an eye to succeeding Daniel Roullier, but only stayed with the job for two years, deeming the hoped-for outcome to be too slow in coming.

From January 1998 until late 1999, he worked for BASF as director of marketing, Europe, for the phytosanitary branch based in Germany, and then as director of agro-activities for France and the Low Countries.

In 1999, Meheut returned to Rhône-Poulenc, which by that time had become Aventis after a merger with Hoechst, which had come about at Jean-René Fourtou's request. In July 1999, he took on direction of Aventis CropScience, an agrochemical and biotechnology subsidiary owned by Aventis and Shering, and then in June 2001, the group's presidency. He sold the group to Bayer in 2002.

A stranger to the world of media, Meheut, who was close to Jean-René Fourtou, who was then the président-directeur général (roughly "Chairman and Chief Executive Officer") of Vivendi Universal, the Canal+ group's main shareholder, then nevertheless chose to join Canal+ in 2002, succeeding Pierre Lescure. He enjoyed a gross monthly salary of more than €100,000. He was also a member of Vivendi's board of directors. During his tenure, he rectified the group's finances, which then featured a growing debt of more than €5 billion and yearly losses of more than €700 million. He secured exclusive rights to the Championnat de France de football, notably by putting up €600 million in 2004, and indeed €1.8 billion over three years. He helped to thwart attempts at the company's takeover by Lagardère and managed the acquisition of TPS ("Télévision Par Satellite"), the TF1 and M6 pay television subsidiary. Canal+'s recovery came about through important cost-reduction measures, and also through numerous asset disposals, such as selling unprofitable foreign subsidiaries, Canal+ Technologies (company responsible for the scrambled-signal decryption devices), the production company Expand, and Numericable. The group then saw important development in France, Africa, Poland, and Vietnam, thereby quickly becoming profitable enough to earn €700 million a year.

In late 2015, after thirteen years as president, Meheut quit his functions as head of Canal+ after Vincent Bolloré took control of the group.

On 21 November 2016, Meheut joined SFR (Altice) as vice-president of the company's board of directors. His arrival solidified the group's ambitions as to television content after acquiring the rights to Premiere League broadcasts and investing in producing series (Les Médicis : Maîtres de Florence) and films.

On 12 April 2018, Meheut was named president of PMU, a group that handles horse racing bets. Another former Canal+ executive, Cyril Linette, was likewise then taken on and named the group's general director. At the same time, Meheut exercised certain non-executive functions on the Accor Group's boards of directors, where he was notably chairman of the remuneration committee, and later the audit committee.

In 2020, Meheut launched "France Channel" with Julien Verley, a digital platform with French content, in the United States (films, series, documentaries), which has been growing ever since.

In 2025, he was named chairman of the remunerations committee of the COJOP ("Comité d'organisation des Jeux olympiques et paralympiques") Alpes françaises 2030. However, he resigned the post on 2 February 2026, denouncing a "significant drift that leads [him] to doubt the project's success, in terms of both timelines and costs".

Meheut died later that same year, on 18 November 2026, at the age of 75. His death came during a trip abroad, in an unspecified country, and the circumstances are likewise unknown.

== Awards and recognitions ==
- 5th place in the French Finn championship (2005)
- Knight of the Legion of Honour
- Manager of the Year in 2006
