= Rouillier =

Rouillier is a French-origin surname. Notable persons with the surname include:

- Chase Roullier (born 1993), American football player
- Daniel Roullier (born 1935), founder of French agribusiness Groupe Roullier
- Karl Rouillier (1814–1858), Russian zoologist and paleontologist
- Tim Ryan Rouillier (born 1964), American country singer
