= History of the European Cup and UEFA Champions League =

Aspect of association football history

The history of the European Cup and UEFA Champions League spans over sixty years of competition, finding winners and runners-up from all over the continent.

== Beginnings ==
=== Early tournaments ===
The first time when champions of two European leagues met was in what was nicknamed the 1895 World Championship, when English champions Sunderland beat Scottish champions Heart of Midlothian 5–3. Ironically, the Sunderland lineup in the 1895 World Championship consisted entirely of Scottish players – Scottish players who moved to England to play professionally in those days were known as the Scotch Professors.

Prior to that, other "Football World Championships" took place, although those were between Scottish and English cup winners, as the respective leagues were not yet established.

Club competitions between teams from European countries trace their origins back as far as 1897, when the Challenge Cup was founded as a competition between clubs from Austria-Hungary that under normal circumstances would not meet in competition. This competition ran until 1911, with its last winners, Wiener Sportclub, retaining the trophy. Simultaneously, English and Scottish clubs competed in the Football World Championship. The Sir Thomas Lipton Trophy was played for in 1909 and 1911 in Turin, Italy, involving clubs from Italy, Germany, Switzerland and England.

The Challenge Cup is considered to be the forerunner of the first true pan-European club competition, the Mitropa Cup, which came about following the demise of Austria-Hungary after World War I. At that time, the various nations of central Europe were introducing professional leagues. The introduction of an international club tournament was intended to assist the new professional clubs financially. The Mitropa Cup was first played for in 1927.

An early attempt to create a cup for national champion clubs of Europe was made by Swiss club Servette in 1930. The tournament called "Coupe des Nations" was a great success and the champions of the ten major European football nations of the time were invited. The cup was won by Hungarian club Újpest. Despite the great success, the tournament was never organised again, due to financial issues.

Following World War II, the reduced standing of the Mitropa Cup led to the foundation of a new competition, the Latin Cup, for teams from France, Italy, Spain and Portugal. This competition was played as a mini-tournament at the end of each season by the league champions from each country. Another tournament was the Coppa Grasshoppers played in 1952 to 1957.

=== Creation of the European Cup ===
The Campeonato Sudamericano de Campeones, or "South American Championship of Champions", kicked off in 1948 after years of deliberation and organisation and set into motion the antecedent of the Copa Libertadores. French sports journalist Jacques Ferran became fascinated with the 1948 South American idea of a continental club champions league. The UEFA document on the history of the European Cup confirms that Jacques Ferran and Gabriel Hanot, journalists for the French sports newspaper L'Équipe, were the founding fathers of the European Cup. In interviews to the Brazilian sports TV programme Globo Esporte in 2015 and Chilean newspaper El Mercúrio in 2018, Jacques Ferran said that the South American Championship of Champions was the inspiration for the European Cup: "How could Europe, which wanted to be ahead of the rest of the world, not be able to accomplish a competition of the same kind of the South American one? We needed to follow that example."

The summer of 1953 saw Wolverhampton Wanderers play a friendly match against a South African XI to begin a remarkable run of victories over the next months. Wolves played a series of friendlies against foreign opposition such as Racing Club of Argentina, Spartak Moscow of the Soviet Union, among others, before meeting Honvéd of Hungary in a game televised live on the BBC. The Honvéd team included many of the Hungary national team, which was dominating world football at the time. Wolves won the game 3–2, which led their manager Stan Cullis and the British press to proclaim them as "Champions of the World". This was the final spur for Hanot who had long campaigned for a European-wide club tournament to determine who was the best of the continent.

Before we declare that Wolverhampton are invincible, let them go to Moscow and Budapest. And there are other internationally renowned clubs: Milan and Real Madrid to name but two. A club world championship, or at least a European one – larger, more meaningful and more prestigious than the Mitropa Cup and more original than a competition for national teams – should be launched.

The UEFA Congress of March 1955 saw the proposal raised, with approval given in April of that year, and the kick-off of the first European Cup the following season. However, there would be no Soviet (until 1967) or English teams in the first tournament.

== Timeline ==
=== 1955 to 1960 – Real Madrid's early dominance ===
Real Madrid dominated the first five competitions, with the team led by Ferenc Puskás, Alfredo Di Stéfano, Francisco Gento and José Santamaría winning each of the first five competitions relatively comfortably, while this was the case, several other clubs did offer some resistance during the late 1950s, notably from Stade de Reims of France, who reached two finals and several Italian clubs such as Milan and Fiorentina. Hibernian were the first British club to play in the European Cup, reaching the semi-final of the inaugural tournament in 1955. The English league winners, Chelsea, were denied entry by the Football League's secretary Alan Hardaker, who believed it was in the best interests of English football and football in general for them not to enter. This era culminated in the famous 1960 European Cup final, at Hampden Park in Glasgow, Scotland, where Real Madrid obliterated Eintracht Frankfurt of West Germany 7–3 in front of BBC and other Eurovision television cameras and a crowd of 127,621. (Hampden Park would go on to achieve the highest attendance for a European club competition match when the European Cup semi-final second leg tie between Celtic and Leeds United was played on 15 April 1970 before a crowd of 136,505. The match was played at Hampden rather than Celtic Park as the huge demand to see the game had been anticipated.)

=== 1961 to 1962 – Benfica success ===
Real Madrid's domination was ended by their biggest domestic rivals, Barcelona, in the first round of the 1960–61 competition, Barça continued on to the final at the Wankdorf Stadion in Bern, where they were defeated (3–2) in a close game by Benfica. This team, captained by the impressive Mário Coluna, were joined by the legendary Eusébio during the following 1961–62 season, where they defended the trophy after beating Real Madrid 5–3 in the final at the Olympisch Stadion in Amsterdam.

=== 1963 to 1965 – Milanese Mastery ===
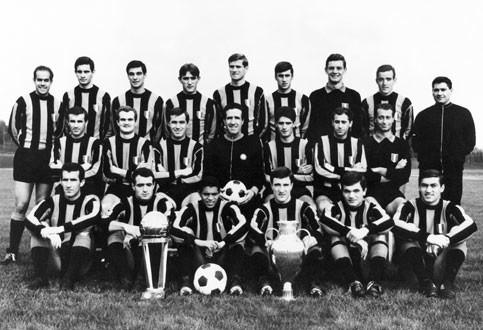
The Inter team which won the European Cup in 1965.

Benfica after winning two European Cups would then go on to reach a third successive final in 1963, but lost to Milan, whose city rivals Inter Milan would win the trophy in both 1964 and 1965, defeating Real Madrid and Benfica, respectively, in the process. This Grande Inter period is well remembered in Italy with many at the time expecting the club to match the domination of Real throughout the decade.

=== 1966 – Real Madrid's return ===
Real Madrid, who defeated Inter in the 1966 semi-final, went to win a sixth European Cup with victory against FK Partizan at the Heysel Stadium in Brussels, of the 1950s side, only Francisco Gento played in all six winning teams, with this Real Madrid being composed solely of Spanish players – a major contrast to the multicultural teams of five years before.

=== 1967 – Lisbon Lions ===
In 1967, Celtic became the first team in Northern Europe to win the competition, coming back from 1–0 down after a Sandro Mazzola penalty to beat Inter Milan 2–1 in the Estádio Nacional in Lisbon, with goals from Tommy Gemmell and Stevie Chalmers. The team, which became known as the Lisbon Lions, managed by Jock Stein, were unique as they were all born within 30 miles (50 km) of Celtic Park in Glasgow.

=== 1968 – The first English team ===
In 1968, ten years after the Munich air disaster, Manchester United became the first English team to win the competition, defeating Benfica in the final 4–1 after extra time at Wembley Stadium in London. Matt Busby, United's manager at the time of the disaster in Munich, survived life-threatening injuries suffered in the crash and was still at the helm for United, and two other Munich survivors played in the game – Bobby Charlton, who scored two goals in the game, and Bill Foulkes.

=== 1969 – AC Milan again ===
Milan brought another Italian victory in 1969 knocking out the two previous winners en route to the final. The 1969 final was against Ajax, marking the emergence of teams from the Netherlands.

=== 1970 to 1973 – Dutch control ===
In 1970 Feyenoord of Rotterdam were the first Dutch outfit to collect the European Cup after defeating Glasgow Celtic the tournaments only coin toss finalists 2–1 after extra time. However, for the next three years, Ajax and its exponents of "Total Football", including Johan Cruyff and Johan Neeskens, among others, together with their pioneering tactician and coach Rinus Michels, would more profoundly take European centre stage, dispatching Panathinaikos, Inter Milan and Juventus in successive finals.

=== 1974 to 1976 – Bayern Munich hat-trick ===
The mid-1970s belonged to Bayern Munich. Led by Franz Beckenbauer, and also starring Sepp Maier, Gerd Müller, Uli Hoeneß and Paul Breitner, the German club not only emulated Ajax's trio of victories but was unmistakably inspired by the beacon of "Total Football". In its first final, Bayern triumphed over Atlético Madrid in a replayed match, the first of the two games ending up in a draw following a late equalizer from Hans Georg Schwarzenbeck, the second one resulting in a 4-0 hammering in Brussels. The following year, Leeds United were controversially – some say corruptly – vanquished 2–0 in an ill-tempered affair at the Parc des Princes in Paris. Lastly, Saint-Étienne were downed at Hampden Park in Glasgow in 1976. Bayern would not only win 3 European cups but they also led 5 Bayern Munich players dominant the entire football world in history winning the UEFA Euro 1972, the 1974 World Cup and then finishing first and second at the UEFA Euro 1976 and the 1976 Summer Olympics as Germany. After this golden period, the side slowly declined and would not win the tournament for 25 years. They would however appear in another final in 1982 with three of the mid-seventies title winners in the squad.

=== 1977 to 1984 – The English Reign ===
In 1977 Liverpool beat Borussia Mönchengladbach 3–1 in Rome, and then in 1978, became the first British club to win the trophy twice by beating the Belgian champions, Club Brugge at Wembley. Liverpool lost in the first round of the 1979 competition to fellow English side Nottingham Forest, who went on to win the tournament, guided by their manager Brian Clough, as they defeated Swedish side Malmö FF 1–0 in the Munich final. The next year, Forest beat Hamburg at the Santiago Bernabéu Stadium by the same scoreline to defend the trophy successfully in 1980 and remain the only side to win the competition more times (twice) than their own domestic league (once). Liverpool returned to the final in 1981 where they picked up their third trophy with a 1–0 win over Real Madrid in Paris.

Another club from England, Aston Villa, won the competition in 1982 with a 1–0 win over Bayern Munich at Feijenoord Stadion in Rotterdam. Hamburg then won the title in 1983, beating Juventus 1–0 in a final that, for the first time in seven years, featured no English side. Liverpool, however, were back in 1984 to defeat Roma in their opponent's stadium, the Stadio Olimpico, in a penalty shoot-out after the teams were tied 1–1, becoming the first team to win the trophy four times since Real Madrid in the 1950s. The match is best known for the antics of Liverpool goalkeeper Bruce Grobbelaar. As Roma's Bruno Conti prepared to take his kick, Grobbelaar walked towards the goal smiling confidently at the cameras lined-up behind, then proceeded to bite the back of the net, in imitation of eating spaghetti. Conti sent his spot kick over the bar. Grobbelaar then produced a similar performance before Francesco Graziani took his kick, famously wobbling his legs in mock terror. Graziani duly missed and Liverpool went on to win the shoot-out 4–2, making Grobbelaar the first African to win a medal in the competition.

=== 1985 – Liverpool, Juventus and the Heysel disaster ===
Liverpool, having won the 1984 tournament, returned to defend the trophy at Brussels a year later. But the 1–0 defeat by Juventus was overshadowed by the death of 39 mostly Juventus fans in the Heysel Stadium. The consequence was a five-year ban from European competition for English clubs, with a six-year ban on Liverpool. The long term consequences for English club football due to the actions of the fans at Heysel were severe in terms of top level success, with English clubs initially struggling to make a significant impact in European competition upon their return from the ban in fact it would be 14 years after Heysel before an English side would again triumph in the competition.

=== 1986 to 1988 – Unlikely heroes ===
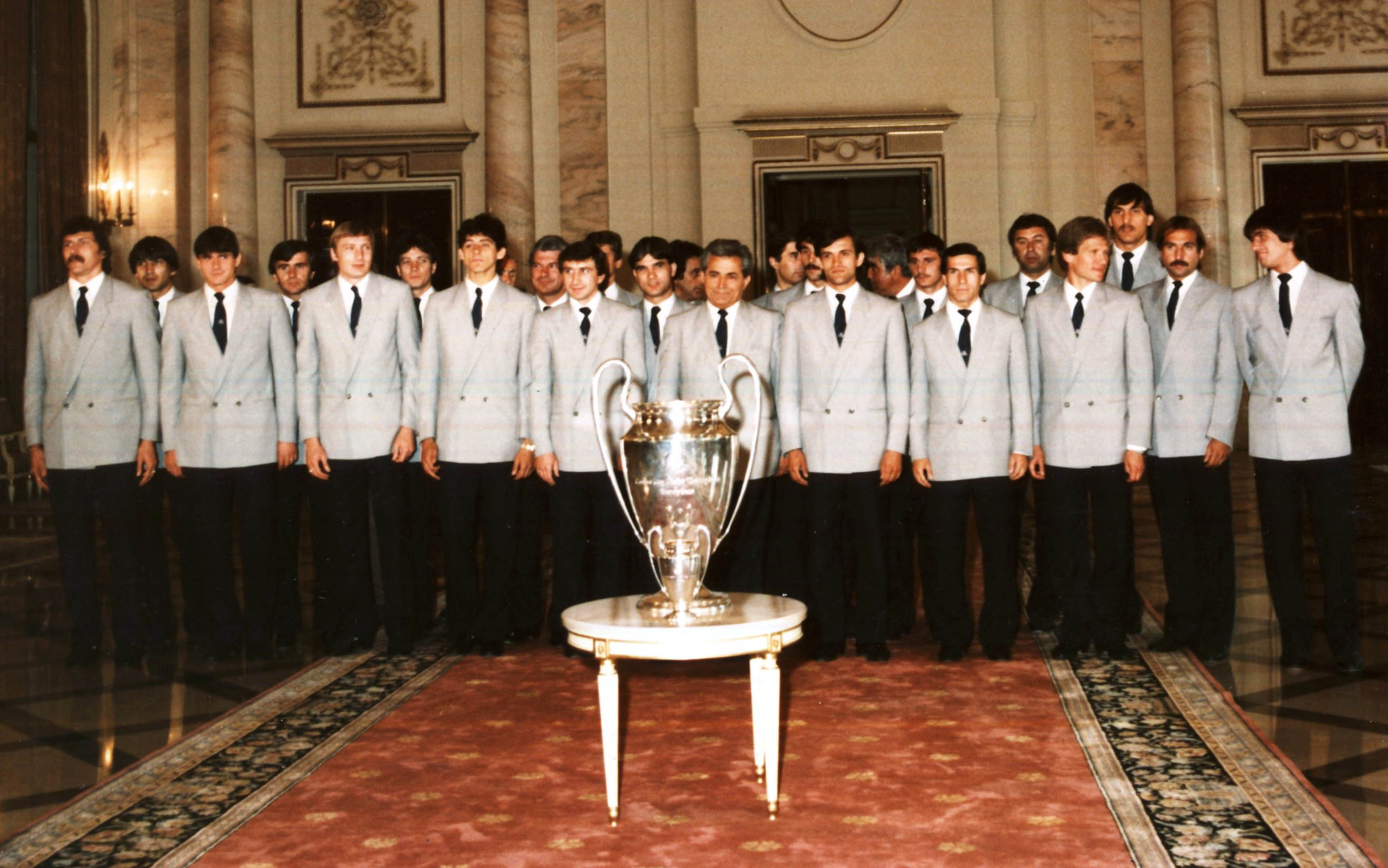
Steaua team with the European Cup in 1986

The first three seasons after the Heysel Disaster saw the European Cup lifted by Steaua București of Romania, Porto of Portugal and PSV Eindhoven of the Netherlands. The final between Porto and Bayern Munich was regarded as an especially exciting final, with an audacious back-heel goal by Algeria's Rabah Madjer giving Porto their first title, while Steaua shocked Barcelona in Seville in a penalty shoot-out, when Steaua's goalkeeper Helmut Duckadam saved four consecutive penalties to win 2–0, making the Bucharest team the first one from Eastern Europe to win.

=== 1989 to 1992 – AC Milan's assertion, and Barcelona's first title ===
In 1989, under the management of Arrigo Sacchi, Milan won the European Cup for the first time in 20 years, defeating 1986 champions Steaua București 4–0 in the final. In 1990, Milan retained their title, defeating Benfica 1–0 in Vienna. The Dutch trio of Marco van Basten, Ruud Gullit and Frank Rijkaard were the brilliant heart of the Italian side, which also featured a defence comprising Mauro Tassotti, Franco Baresi, Alessandro Costacurta and Paolo Maldini, often considered one of the greatest defences in the history of the game.

The 1991 trophy went to Yugoslav league champions Red Star Belgrade, who beat Marseille on penalties after a goalless draw. The 1991 final was also the only final in the period from 1989 to 1998 that failed to feature an Italian team. The ban on English clubs in European football was lifted for the 1990–91 season, but English champions Liverpool were unable to compete in the European Cup because they had to serve an extra year. The 1991–92 European Cup, which would be the last season under that name, underwent a change, with the quarter-finals being transformed into a group format. The final, played at Wembley Stadium, was won by Barcelona against Sampdoria. Barça, at the time nicknamed the "Dream Team", were coached by Johan Cruyff.

=== 1993 – The birth of the Champions League; Marseille attain first title ===
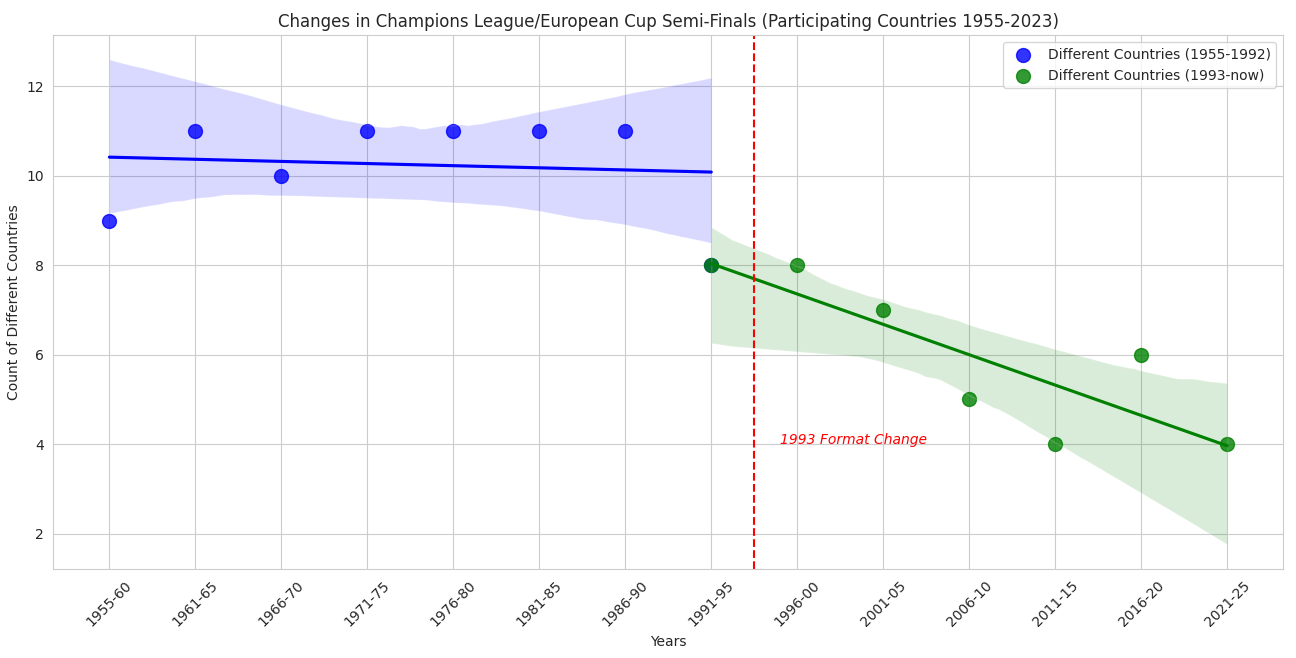
Diversity of countries represented in the semi-finals of the UEFA Champions League/European Cup since 1955

The competition was renamed to UEFA Champions League for the 1992–93 season, undergoing some diverse changes of marketing and TV rights thanks to the partnership of UEFA and TEAM Marketing AG. The eight teams participating in the league format quarter-finals experienced an approach to match organisation and commercialisation that was very new.

The reformatting of the competition since the 1992-93 season has coincided with a marked reduction in the diversity of participating countries in the latter stages of the competition, with clubs from only four different countries represented in the semi-finals between 2021 and 2023.

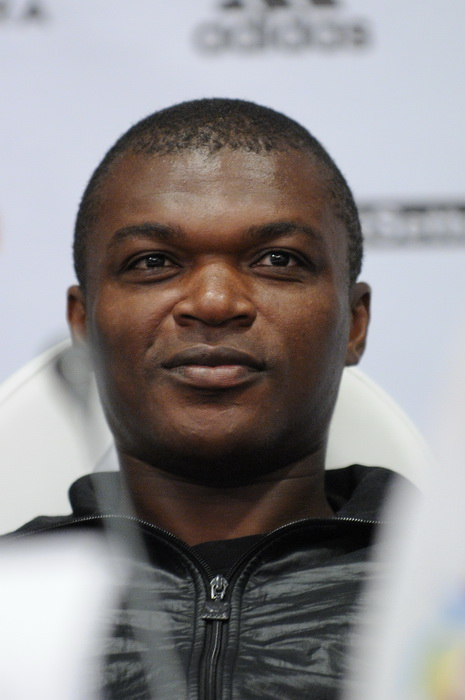
Marcel Desailly, who won the European Cup with Marseille and Milan in consecutive years.

Marseille defeated Milan in the 1993 final, and became the first team to win the Champions League and the first European champions from France. They were later banned from defending their crown in what was only the beginning of a collapse which arose from domestic match fixing committed by chairman Bernard Tapie. The club was eventually stripped of their Ligue 1 championship after it was revealed that Tapie had cooked the club's financial books.

=== 1994 to 1997 – AC Milan title, Ajax and Juventus return and Borussia's first title ===
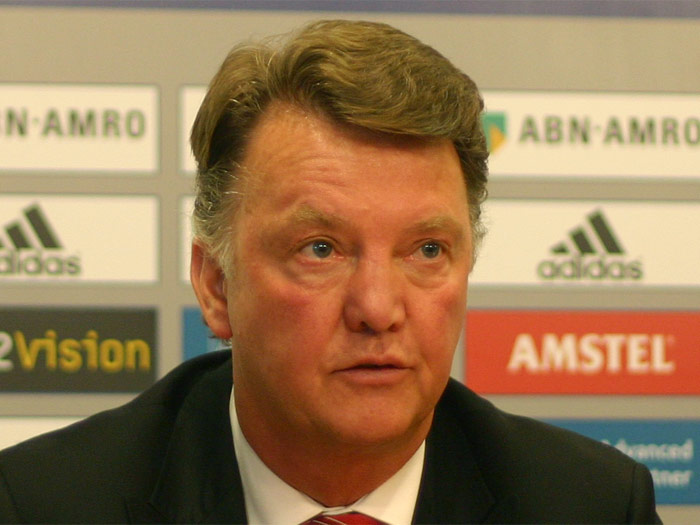
Louis van Gaal

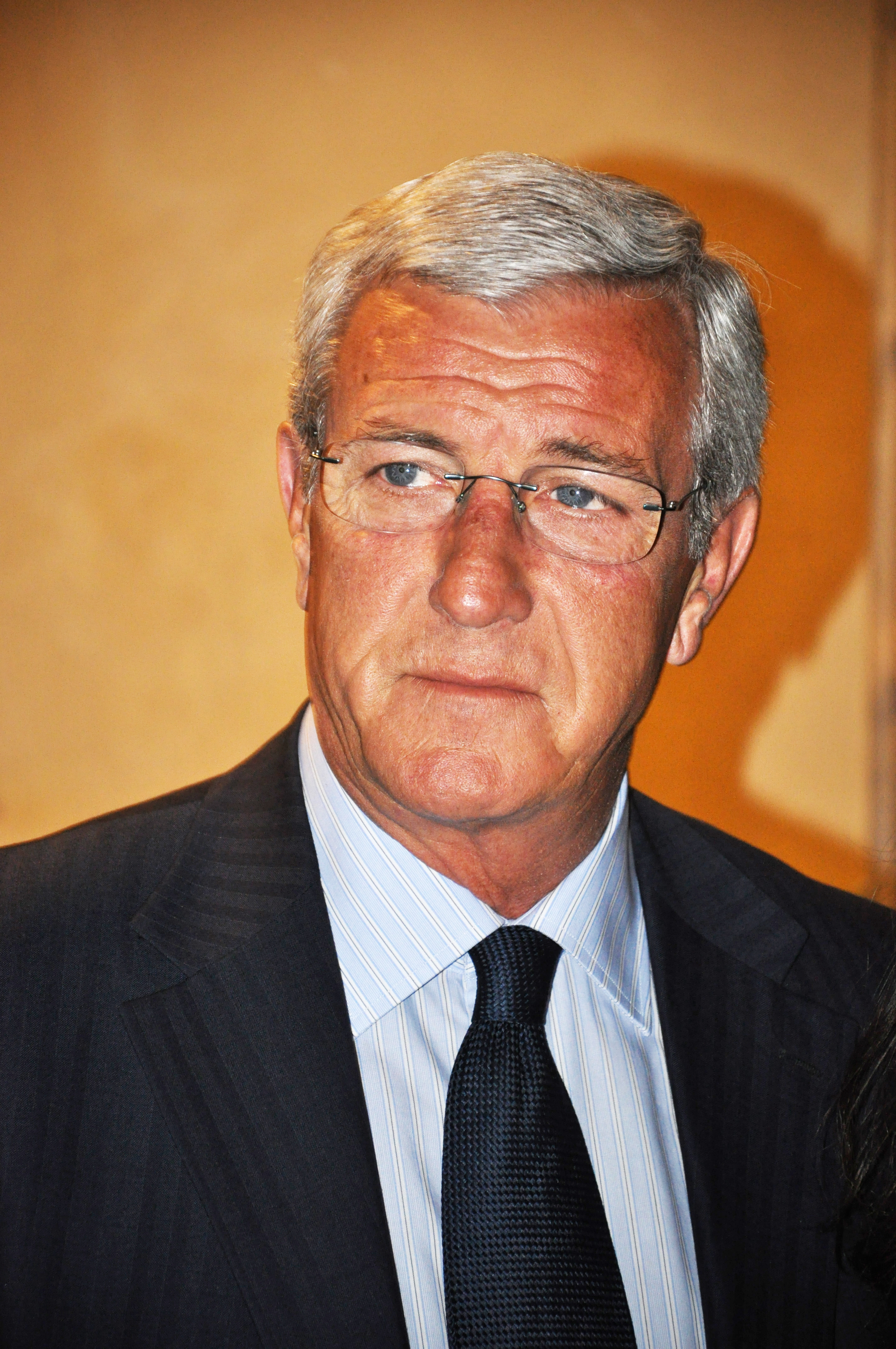
Marcello Lippi

Ajax's Louis van Gaal (left) and Juventus' Marcello Lippi (right) faced off in the 1996 UEFA Champions League final.

Milan reclaimed the trophy in 1994, beating a star-studded Barcelona side, 4–0, in what many have hailed as one of the finest European Cup final performances of the modern age. Milan were the underdogs, with two key defenders forced to sit out, but coach Fabio Capello spurned the traditional Italian caution of catenaccio and led them to a rout of Johan Cruyff's "Dream Team". Milan defender Marcel Desailly had previously played for Marseille when they won the Champions League, being the first player to win the Cup in consecutive seasons with different clubs, and also making him the first player to transfer to the finals opposing side. Milan also went on to reach the final in 1995 but lost 1–0 to a youthful Ajax side featuring Edwin van der Sar, Frank de Boer, Ronald de Boer, Edgar Davids, Clarence Seedorf, Marc Overmars, Jari Litmanen and Patrick Kluivert, as well as the veterans Frank Rijkaard and Danny Blind. It was the club's first triumph since 1973, when they had won three titles consecutively. Ajax, in turn, reached the next final in 1996, but fell to Juventus of Ciro Ferrara, the 1993 winner Didier Deschamps, Paulo Sousa and the notable offensive trio composed by Alessandro Del Piero, Fabrizio Ravanelli and the 1992 finalist Gianluca Vialli after a penalty shoot-out. Vialli became the sixth Italian player (after former Juventus players Sergio Brio, Antonio Cabrini, Gaetano Scirea, Marco Tardelli and Stefano Tacconi) to have won the three seasonal European club titles, first striker to do so.

Borussia Dortmund won the UEFA Champions League in 1997. In the final in Munich, Dortmund faced Juventus. Karl-Heinz Riedle put Dortmund ahead shooting under the goalkeeper from a cross by Paul Lambert. Riedle then made it two with a bullet header from a corner kick. In the second half, Alessandro Del Piero pulled one back for Juventus with a back heel, then 20-year-old substitute and local boy Lars Ricken latched on to a through pass by Andreas Möller. Only 16 seconds after coming on to the pitch, Ricken chipped Angelo Peruzzi in the Juventus goal from over 20 yards with his first touch of the ball. Dortmund lifted the trophy with a 3–1 victory. Dortmund manager Ottmar Hitzfeld was able to lift the title for the first time. As of 2024, Dortmund remain the only team to have won the tournament after its rebranding having never reached the European Cup or the Champions League final previously. Valencia, Bayer Leverkusen, Monaco, Arsenal, Chelsea, Tottenham Hotspur, Paris Saint-Germain and Manchester City subsequently failed since.

=== Real Madrid's return and dominance (1997–2002) ===
The following six seasons would see Real Madrid winning the competition three times.

==== 1998 – Real Madrid, back to the top ====
In 1997–98, UEFA allowed the runners-up of top European leagues to compete in the Champions League. UEFA's rationale was that the quality of its premier tournament increased by including more top teams from big leagues rather than minnows. An old face claimed the crown in 1998: Real Madrid. The Spanish club won their first European Cup since 1966 and seventh overall when they beat Juventus 1–0 in the Italian club's third straight final (and second straight defeat).

==== 1999 – Manchester United return ====
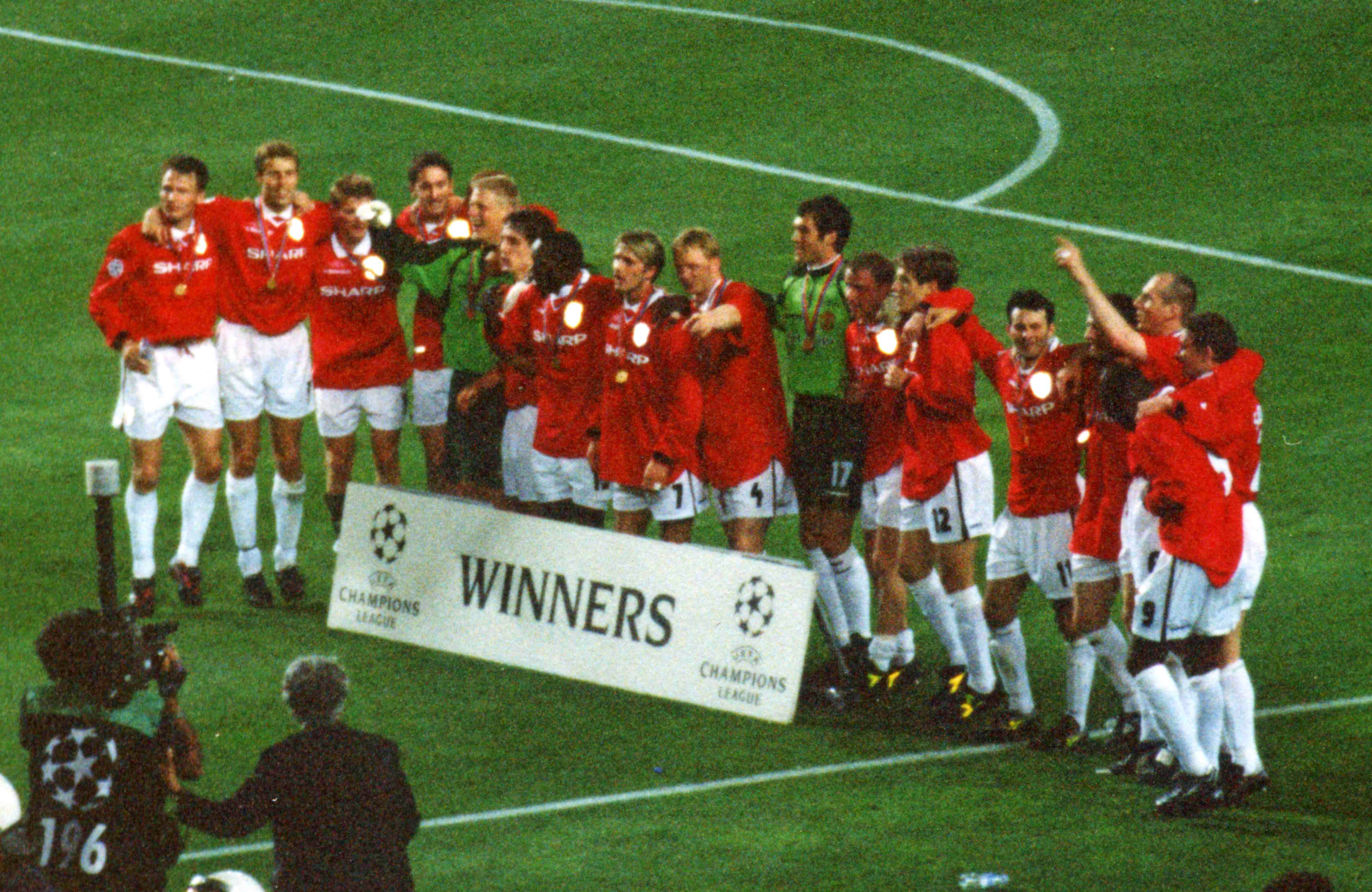
Manchester United's players celebrate after the game.

1998–99 is remembered for the upset of Ottmar Hitzfeld's Bayern by Manchester United's treble success. United had already forged a reputation for late comebacks in England as they picked up the Premier League and FA Cup en route to the Champions League final. Having succeeded in both the league and FA Cup, the omens appeared to be with Manchester United for the Champions League. With Paul Scholes and captain Roy Keane suspended, goalkeeper Peter Schmeichel – playing his last match for the club – captained the team on the night, which was the 90th anniversary of the birth of Sir Matt Busby. Their opponents, Bayern Munich, were also chasing The Treble, and took the lead after just six minutes through a clever Mario Basler free-kick. It appeared to be enough for Bayern as Manchester United failed to find a way through, although Schmeichel was in inspirational form to keep his team in the game. With referee Pierluigi Collina signalling three minutes of stoppage time, the English club sent everyone forward (including Schmeichel) for a David Beckham corner, and were rewarded when substitute Teddy Sheringham turned home the equaliser after Ryan Giggs mis-hit a shot at goal. Just over a minute later, another Beckham corner again provided the danger as Sheringham headed it on to fellow substitute Ole Gunnar Solskjær, who flicked out a boot to send the ball into the roof of the net and win the European Cup for Manchester. United's manager, Alex Ferguson, memorably summed the experience up in a post-match interview when he said: "Football, bloody hell." It was the club's first success since 1968 and marked the first English winner since Liverpool in 1984.

==== 2000 to 2002 – Real Madrid and Bayern Munich: reinvigoration ====
The 1999–2000 season saw UEFA again ease the entry requirements for the Champions League. Now the top three leagues (Spain, Italy, and Germany, according to UEFA's rankings) could enter four teams, while the next three (England, France, and the Netherlands) could enter three.

This season saw Spanish clubs return to the top of the European table with the first all-country European Cup/Champions League final between Real Madrid and Valencia. Real Madrid started the 21st century in similar fashion to their 20th century exploits by defeating Valencia 3–0 to lift the European Cup again. On the way to the final, Real also successively eliminated the previous year's runners-up (Bayern Munich, semi-finals), and champions (Manchester United, quarter-finals). The tie against Manchester United saw a 3–2 away victory at Old Trafford, which included a goal created by midfielder Fernando Redondo and dubbed el taconazo (backheel) de Old Trafford.

La Liga had another good outing in the 2001 Champions League, with Real Madrid and Valencia again reaching the semi-finals. Valencia returned to the final again in the 2001 only to lose again. The winner this time was Bayern Munich, who had earlier ousted defending champions Real Madrid in the semi-finals. The final ended 1–1 and Bayern won the shoot-out 5–4. That win also gave coach Ottmar Hitzfeld the distinction of winning the European Cup with two teams, having lifted it in 1997 with Borussia Dortmund. Valencia had now lost two Champions League finals in a row.

Real Madrid faced another German team (Bayer Leverkusen) in the 2002 final at Glasgow's Hampden Park. Real Madrid were pursuing a policy at the time of signing one world-class player a year. That season they had added multiple FIFA World Player of the Year winner, Zinedine Zidane, for a fee of €71 million. Zidane volleyed home the winner in their 2–1 victory that gave the club its ninth European Cup and the third European Cup in five seasons, Bayer became the first finalist never to have won their domestic league; they had earlier lost the Bundesliga title in the last match of the season, and subsequently also lost in the DFB-Pokal final, to achieve a runners-up treble.

=== Parity amid Italian and English prominence (2003–2008) ===
==== 2003 and 2004 – All-Italian final and Porto's second title ====
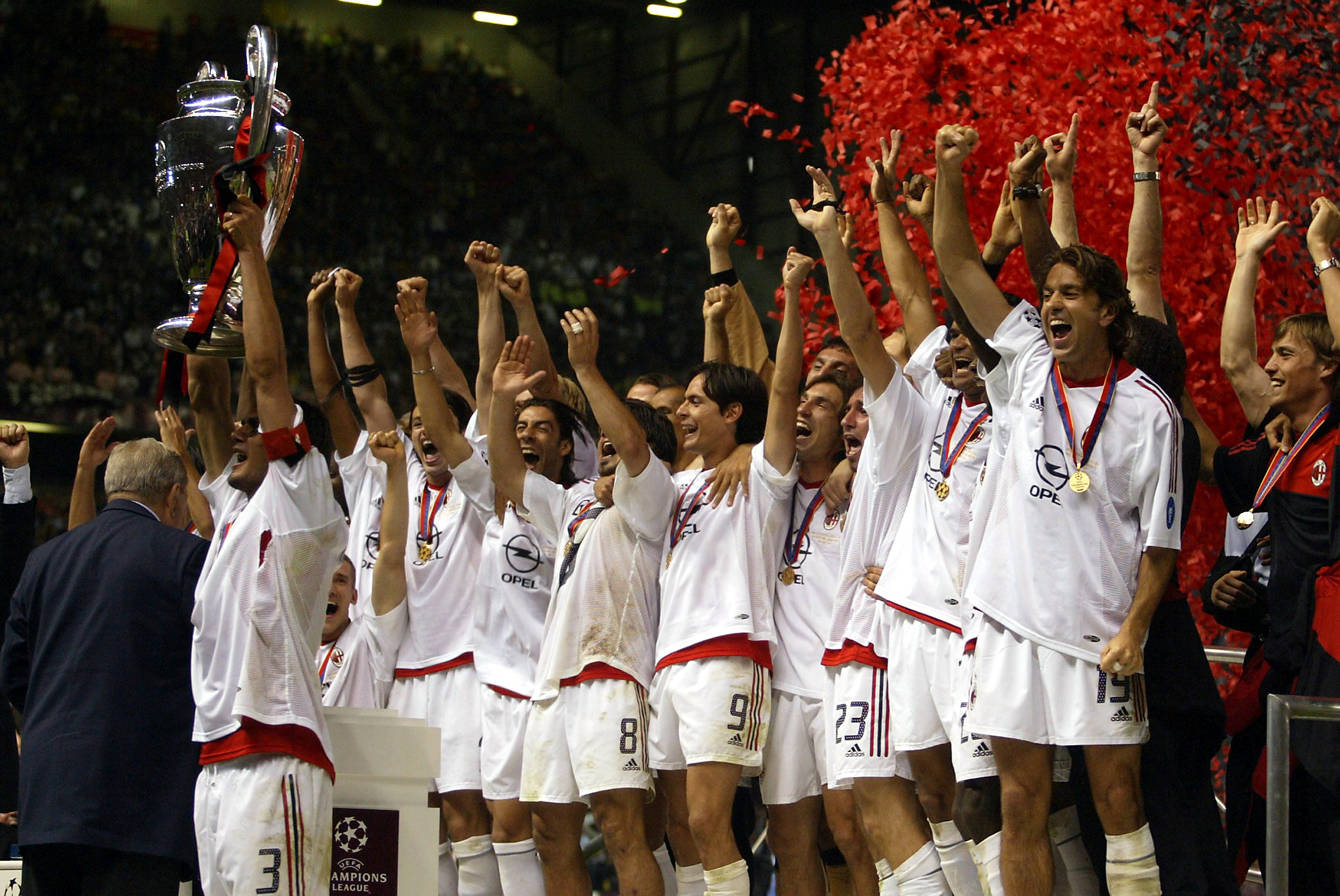
AC Milan celebrate their sixth European Cup title.

The next season saw Italian clubs return to the top of the European table. Juventus also made history in the European group stage by defeating Olympiacos 7–0. Although they had dominated the competition through the 1990s, there were no Serie A clubs in the quarter-finals in 2002. The following season, however, saw three Italian semi-finalists – and a final between Milan and Juventus. Milan won their sixth European Cup when they beat their old rivals 3–2 on penalties following a 0–0 draw. Milan captain Paolo Maldini lifted the trophy in Manchester exactly 40 years after his father Cesare had done so for Milan in London. Clarence Seedorf won the Champions League for the third time, and with three clubs. He had earlier won the cup with Ajax in 1995 and Real Madrid in 1998.

There was a major upset in 2004 when Porto defeated Monaco 3–0 to win the Champions League. Goals were scored by Carlos Alberto, Deco and Dmitri Alenichev. Neither team had been tipped for any success in the competition, but between them they managed to defeat Manchester United, Real Madrid and Chelsea, among other clubs. Porto and their manager José Mourinho achieved the rare feat of following up a UEFA Cup victory by winning the Champions League the next season. Russian international Alenichev became only the third player after Ronald Koeman and Ronaldo to score a goal in two consecutive different European finals and Vítor Baía became the ninth player to have won the three European club titles.

==== 2005 to 2008 – Liverpool's Miracle in Istanbul, Barcelona, AC Milan and Manchester United ====
There was a similar surprise in 2005. This time, it involved two of Europe's most successful clubs, with six-time European champions Milan facing four-time winners Liverpool in one of the most dramatic finals in the competition's history. Milan broke through after just 52 seconds with Maldini striking the fastest goal in European Cup final history. The Italians took control of the game, Andriy Shevchenko fed Hernán Crespo five minutes before half-time to make it 2–0, only for Crespo to add another two minutes later after a defence-splitting pass from Kaká. With just under ten minutes of the second half played, captain Steven Gerrard scored with a header to begin the comeback. Vladimír Šmicer's long-range drive made it 3–2 just two minutes later and, on the hour mark, Spanish midfielder Xabi Alonso completed the comeback by converting the rebound from his saved penalty kick to make it 3–3. Liverpool's three goals came in the space of only six minutes. Milan almost won it at the end of extra time when Shevchenko was twice denied in quick succession by Jerzy Dudek. That proved crucial as they moved on to a penalty shoot-out where Liverpool triumphed 3–2 and captured their fifth European Cup victory and as five-time winners earned the honour of keeping the trophy.

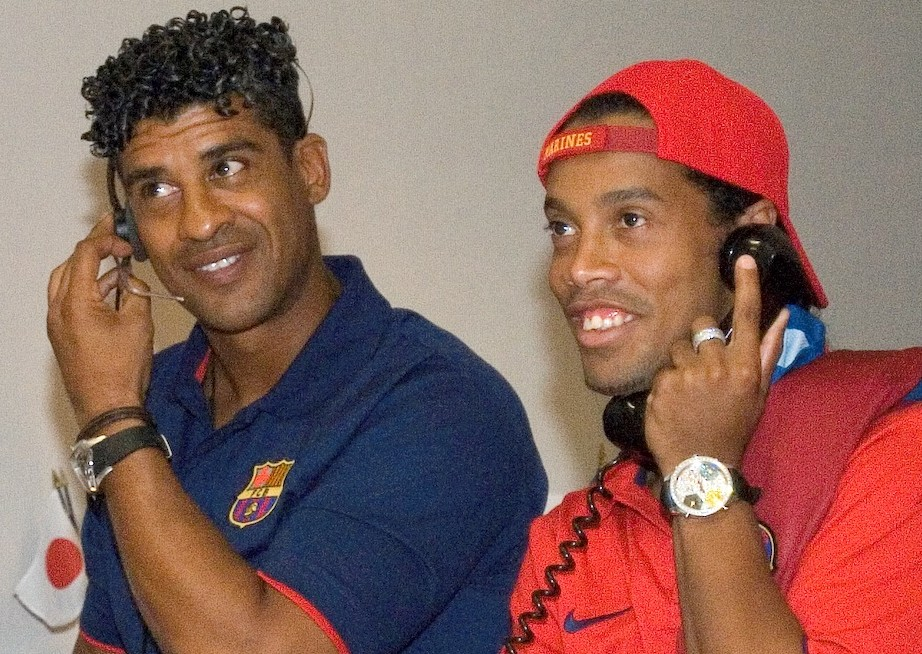
Frank Rijkaard and Ronaldinho

After three years of dominance by La Liga from 2000 to 2002, Spain teams were not as successful during 2003–2005 as they only had semi-finalists Real Madrid in 2003 and Deportivo de La Coruña in 2004. In 2006, they made a triumphant return with Barcelona and Villarreal in the semi-finals. The semi-finalists were Villarreal, Arsenal, Milan, and Barcelona. Arsenal succeeded in holding off Villarreal (including a Jens Lehmann save of a late penalty from Juan Román Riquelme) to a 0–0 draw which put them through to final. Barcelona played Milan in the other semi-final, and held on to the 1–0 advantage of the first leg to qualify for the final. In the final, held on 17 May at the Stade de France, Lehmann became the first player ever to be sent off in a European Cup/Champions League final after fouling Samuel Eto'o just outside the penalty area. Arsenal took the lead from a Sol Campbell header in the 37th minute and held it for most of the second half, with substitute keeper Manuel Almunia tipping away a shot by Eto'o. Eto'o equalised off a probing feed from substitute Henrik Larsson in the 76th minute. Five minutes later, another Larsson ball found Juliano Belletti, who put the second goal through the legs of Almunia to give Barça their final 2–1 margin.

In the 2006–07 season, English sides dominated again. In a repeat of the 2005 semi-final, Liverpool knocked out Chelsea this time in a shoot-out. Chelsea won the first leg at Stamford Bridge 1–0 thanks to a goal by Joe Cole, but Daniel Agger levelled the aggregate scoreline at Anfield. Thus, the match went to penalties which Liverpool won 4–1, with keeper Pepe Reina saving twice. This was Chelsea's third semi-final defeat in four years. The first leg of the other semi-final between Milan and Manchester United, at Old Trafford, was an exciting match with Cristiano Ronaldo opening the scoring, only for two Kaká goals to put Milan ahead 2–1 at half time. A Wayne Rooney brace in the second half gave United a 3–2 aggregate lead. The second leg at the San Siro, however, was a one-sided affair with Milan outclassing Man United from the start and winning 3–0 thanks to goals from Kaká, Clarence Seedorf and Alberto Gilardino, and thus setting up a revenge meeting with Liverpool in the final. Milan got their revenge as they won the final 2–1, two goals from Filippo Inzaghi proving to be the difference. Liverpool scored late on through Dirk Kuyt, giving the Reds hope of another amazing comeback but to no avail, and Milan were European champions for a seventh time.

The 2008 UEFA Champions League final was the first all English club final in European Cup/Champions League history, and was played out between Manchester United and Chelsea in front of a packed-out Luzhniki Stadium in Moscow. United took the lead midway through the first half when Cristiano Ronaldo's header met Wes Brown's cross and bounced into the bottom left-hand corner of Petr Čech's goal. Poor defending, however, enabled Frank Lampard to equalise in the last minute of the first half. Although both sides created chances, the scoreline remained 1–1 until the end of extra time, and penalties loomed. Didier Drogba became the second player to be sent off in a European Cup/Champions League final in the second period of extra time for a slap on Nemanja Vidić. Extra time finished and a penalty shoot-out was to decide it. Both teams scored their first two penalties, but Cristiano Ronaldo's shot was saved by Petr Čech. For Chelsea's last penalty, however, captain John Terry slipped as he was taking the shot, and the ball hit the outside of the post and flew helplessly wide. In the second round of sudden death, Ryan Giggs successfully converted his penalty before Edwin van der Sar won the Champions' League for United by saving Nicolas Anelka's effort.

=== Spanish dominance (2008–2018) ===
The following ten competitions would see the Spanish dominance rise to unprecedented levels, with Barcelona and Real Madrid winning seven titles, as well as having Atlético Madrid reach two finals. Real Madrid reached the semi-finals of the competition for eight consecutive seasons, from 2010–11 to 2017–18, winning four titles, including La Décima and the three in a row.

==== 2009 to 2011 – Guardiola's Barcelona dominate, Mourinho's Inter Milan treble, and Manchester United's two UCL finals against Barça ====
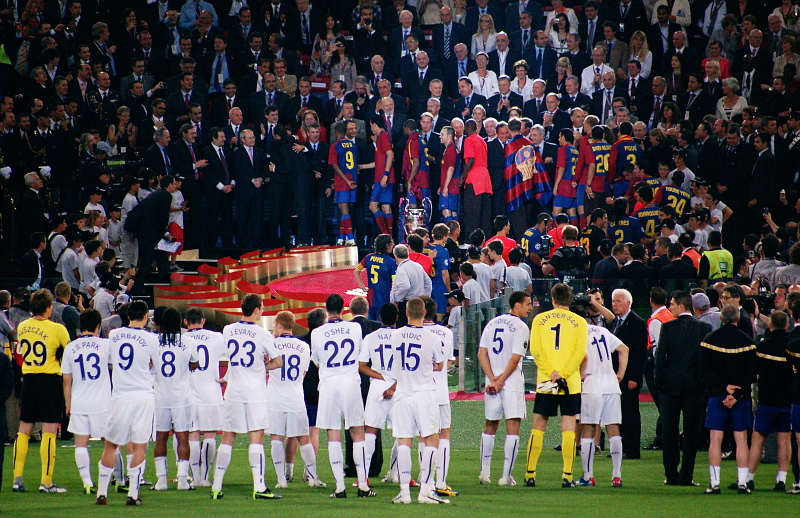
Manchester United's players look on as their Barcelona counterparts receive their winners' medals.

En route to the final, Barcelona overcame Chelsea in a controversial semi-final when Andrés Iniesta scored for Barcelona in London in injury time, advancing them to the final on away goals. The other semi-final saw Arsenal face Manchester United, with United winning the first leg 1–0 then winning the second leg in London 3–1, advancing through on a 4–1 aggregate scoreline. On 27 May 2009, Barcelona overcame Manchester United at the Stadio Olimpico in Rome, winning 2–0 with goals from Samuel Eto'o and Lionel Messi. This made Barça the first team from La Liga to win a domestic cup, domestic league, and European Cup treble. This was made all the remarkable by the fact that it was coach Pep Guardiola's first season in charge, with just one year as coach of the B team as previous experience. At age 38, Guardiola, who also won the title as a player with Barça in 1992, became the youngest coach ever to lead a team to the trophy.

In 2010, for the first time in five years, no English teams were featured in the semi-finals (three English teams were in the semi-finals for each of the past three seasons before), with Manchester United and Arsenal both being eliminated in the quarter-finals. Inter Milan stunned Barcelona with a 3–1 win in Milan in the semi-final first leg, holding them to 1–0 the second leg, thus advancing through. Bayern Munich defeated Lyon 4–0 on aggregate to advance to the final. On 22 May 2010, Inter Milan, coached by José Mourinho, beat Bayern 2–0 at the Santiago Bernabéu, becoming the first and so far only Italian team to win the continental treble.

On 28 May 2011 at Wembley Stadium in London, Barcelona beat Manchester United for a second final in three years. The Catalans dominated the match, winning 3–1 with goals from Pedro, Lionel Messi and David Villa, securing their fourth Champions League title. Wayne Rooney scored for Manchester United to level the score going into half-time. This marked Barcelona's fourth title overall and third title in six seasons (2005–06 to 2010–11).

==== 2012 to 2013 – Chelsea's first title and Bayern's return ====
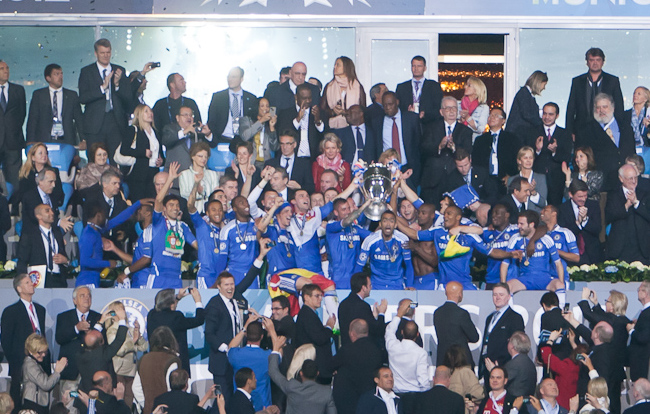
Chelsea received the trophy from UEFA President Michel Platini.

On 19 May 2012, at the Allianz Arena in Munich, Chelsea finally, against the odds, delivered the big prize to London and also back to England. In a come-from-behind victory over Bayern Munich, they won 4–3 on penalties after the game had finished 1–1 after extra time. Bayern enjoyed much possession but failed to capitalise, allowing Didier Drogba to equalise late in the game after Thomas Müller had given Bayern the lead. During the penalty shoot-out, Čech, who saved a penalty by ex-Chelsea player Arjen Robben earlier in extra-time, saved two spot-kicks and set the stage for Drogba to score the winner with the final kick.

The 2012–13 competition saw the first all-German final between Bayern Munich and Borussia Dortmund after their victories over Spanish clubs Barcelona and Real Madrid, respectively, in the semi-finals. Bayern Munich's victory was somewhat impressive, as they defeated a struggling Barcelona side 7–0 on aggregate to set the record of biggest two-leg win in a semi-final replacing Manchester United's 6–1 win over Schalke 04 in 2011. In the final, Bayern beat Dortmund 2–1, with Robben scoring the winning goal 89 minutes into the match and won their fifth UEFA Champions League and after winning the titles of the Bundesliga one week before and the DFB-Pokal, Bayern Munich became the first German team to win the treble.

==== 2014 to 2018 – Real Madrid at the center of Spanish dominance: Los Blancos win four titles in five years, Barcelona win their second treble ====
Real Madrid won their long-awaited La Decima (translates into Spanish as "the tenth"), their record-breaking tenth European Cup/UEFA Champions League title, in the 2013–14 season following a 4–1 win after extra time in the final against city rivals and La Liga champions Atlético Madrid. It was the first same-city final and the second all-Spanish final. Diego Simeone coached Atlético in an incredible season after clinching the Spanish league title a week before the final and his side led 1–0 through Diego Godín until a Sergio Ramos header deep into injury time took it to extra time.

In 2015, Barcelona won their fifth Champions League trophy, defeating Juventus by three goals to one in the final. By winning their fifth title, Barcelona became the first European football club in history to achieve the continental treble twice. Barcelona's attacking trio of Messi, Suárez and Neymar, dubbed "MSN", scored 122 goals in all competitions, the most in a season for an attacking trio in Spanish football history.

In 2016, Real Madrid and Atlético Madrid both reached the final again. This game was a rematch of the 2014 final, and became the third all-Spanish final and the second same-city final in the tournament's history. The match went to penalties after the score finished at 1–1 at the end of extra time. Real Madrid went on to win their 11th title after beating Atlético 5–3 on penalties, with Cristiano Ronaldo scoring the winning penalty for Los Blancos.

The victory in the 2017 final against Juventus made Real Madrid the first team ever to defend their title in the Champions League era, and the first to win consecutive titles in the competition since Milan in 1989 and 1990, when the tournament was known as the European Cup. Real Madrid's title was its 12th, extending its record, and its third in four years. The achievement is also known as La Duodécima. Real Madrid won their third title in a row in 2018, beating Liverpool 3–1 in Kyiv. It was a match to forget for Liverpool goalkeeper Loris Karius who made two errors during the match: he performed a wayward throw which rebounded off Karim Benzema for Real Madrid's first goal. Then, following a great overhead bicycle kick by Gareth Bale for the Spaniards' second, he mishandled a long-range shot by Bale for Real Madrid's third.

Between 2010 and 2018, Real Madrid reached the semi-finals eight consecutive times, while Bayern and Barcelona achieved the feat five times.

=== Premier League leads the way (2018–present) ===
The following years would see two all-English finals, as well as Liverpool losing the 2022 final to Real Madrid. In 2023, Manchester City won their first ever title and a first tournament for the third English victory in five years.

==== 2019 – English teams contest the final after stunning comebacks ====
After Cristiano Ronaldo left Real Madrid, they struggled to replicate the same form as the previous four years and failed in their title defence. Ajax made the first semi finals since 1997 knocking out Real Madrid and Juventus. Their squad was one of the youngest, with De Ligt the youngest captain. Tottenham won against Manchester City in a controversial turnover of Raheem Sterling's 95th min goal by VAR and knocked out Ajax in the injury time comeback with Lucas Moura scoring on 93 mins breaking the hearts of Ajax players and fans. Liverpool won against FC Barcelona 4-0 after a dramatic turnaround losing 3–0 in the first leg which was again a humiliating knockout of FC Barcelona after AS Roma in 2018 quarter finals. Manchester United also won on away goals against PSG with dramatic comeback turning around 2–0 to 3-1 which resulted in aggregate score of 3–3. Manchester United lost 4–0 on aggregate against FC Barcelona in quarter finals. Liverpool won their sixth European Cup by defeating fellow English side Tottenham Hotspur in the 2019 final. An early penalty converted by Mohamed Salah and a late Divock Origi goal ensured a 2–0 victory for Jürgen Klopp's team. Both finalists had achieved unlikely comebacks in their semi-finals, with Liverpool overcoming a first-leg 3–0 defeat by Barcelona with a second-leg 4–0 win and Tottenham scoring the three second-half goals they required to defeat Ajax in the second leg in Amsterdam and also on away goals.

==== 2020 – COVID-19 pandemic and Bayern superiority ====
The 2019–20 season was disrupted by the COVID-19 pandemic, with round of 16 matches that were still ongoing being suspended until further notice. The host city for the final would eventually be changed from Istanbul to Lisbon, as was the majority of the remainder of the competition. The knockout stage resumed in August, with remaining second leg round of 16 games being played behind closed doors at their respective home stadiums as part of the season restart. Quarter-final and semi-final matches were played in only one leg at the Estadio Jose Alvalade and Estádio da Luz over the course of about two weeks, following the teams' completion of their respective domestic seasons.

After winning every match post-restart to secure a league and cup double, Bayern Munich continued their dominance in the Champions League, following up their perfect group stage record with an aggregate victory over Chelsea, an 8–2 thrashing of Barcelona and 3–0 win against Lyon, reaching the final with a 100 percent win record still intact in the competition. Their opponents in the final would be Paris Saint-Germain, who had reached the showpiece match for the first time in club history. The match was the first ever final to be played in the month of August and the second final between teams from France and Germany, after Bayern's win over Saint-Étienne in 1976.

With the match scoreless after half-time, former PSG player Kingsley Coman scored a header in the 59th minute against his old club, securing a 1–0 win for Bayern that sealed a second treble in club history, following up from the one they achieved in the 2012–13 season. Bayern lifted the European Cup for the sixth time, equalling Liverpool on the all-time list, and became only the second European team after Barcelona to secure multiple continental trebles. They also became the first side to win every match of a Champions League campaign.

==== 2021 – Super League threat and Chelsea surprise ====
The 2020–21 UEFA Champions League continued despite the COVID-19 pandemic, albeit with a condensed schedule. Porto and Chelsea were unlikely heroes when they won against Juventus and Atlético Madrid respectively. Defending champions Bayern Munich were knocked out on away goals by previous finalists PSG after missing Robert Lewandowski with injury in a rematch of the 2020 final.

Behind closed doors however, The Super League was being planned and was unexpectedly announced on 18 April by Real Madrid, Atlético Madrid, Barcelona, the "Big Six" English clubs (Arsenal, Chelsea, Liverpool, Manchester City, Manchester United and Tottenham Hotspur), Juventus, and the two big Milan clubs (Milan and Inter Milan), which threatened the existence of the Champions League. UEFA president Aleksander Čeferin and several delegates threatened to expel the clubs joining The Super League when Chelsea, Manchester City and Real Madrid were in the semi-finals. Rumours persisted that PSG were expected to win the Champions League by default after rejecting an offer to join. Borussia Dortmund, Porto and Bayern Munich also refused offers to join The Super League. FIFA and UEFA opposed The Super League and there were widespread protests from fans, governments, players, FAs and much of the football world, forcing the Big Six English clubs to withdraw from the league. The Milan clubs later followed suit with Atlético Madrid also withdrawing; Andrea Agnelli, chairman of Juventus and vice-chairman of The Super League, conceded that the project would not proceed. Florentino Pérez, president of Real Madrid and chairman of The Super League, cited lack of profits, lack of interest from younger fans, fewer matches between elite clubs in the Champions League and the pandemic as reasons for the creation of The Super League. Court proceedings by the remaining Super League clubs and UEFA are ongoing in the European Court of Justice.

Chelsea made the semi-finals for the first time in seven years facing Real Madrid for the first time. Man City defeated PSG 4–1 on aggregate en route to their first appearance in the final, while Chelsea defeated Real Madrid 3–1 on aggregate to set up the second all-English final in three years. Chelsea won the title for the second time after defeating City 1–0 at the Estádio do Dragão thanks to a goal by Kai Havertz.

==== 2022 to 2024 – Ancelotti's Real Madrid dominance and Guardiola's second treble with Manchester City ====
Heading into the 2021–22 UEFA Champions League, Real Madrid were not considered heavy favorites with all eyes on PSG, who had assembled a super team by acquiring Lionel Messi, Sergio Ramos, and Gianluigi Donnarumma in the offseason. However, Real Madrid made an incredible run to the trophy, beating PSG in the Round of 16, defending champions Chelsea in the quarterfinals, heavy favorites Manchester City in the semifinals (thanks to two stunning late goals by Rodrygo) and a Karim Benzema penalty in extra time to advance to the final against favorites Liverpool, who they beat 1-0 following a lone Vinícius Júnior goal in the 59th minute. Villarreal CF made a very solid run to the semifinals, knocking out Juventus and FC Bayern Münich.

The 2022–23 UEFA Champions League saw Manchester City finally win the trophy after years of disappointment under Pep Guardiola, beating Italian club Inter Milan in the final after a lone goal by Rodri in the 68th minute, marking the 4th consecutive time the UEFA Champions League Final finished 1-0. Inter also notably faced local rivals AC Milan in the semifinals, marking the first time since 2005 the clubs met in the Champions League. One of the biggest contributors to City’s win was new signing Erling Haaland who finished as the top scorer in the competition for the 2nd time in 3 seasons with 12 goals. With PSG again being considered favorites, they were disappointingly eliminated in the Round of 16 for the 2nd season in a row to FC Bayern Münich. With Lionel Messi joining Inter Miami in the offseason, this would be his final Champions League, meaning Messi and Cristiano Ronaldo (who had signed for Al Nassr in December) were officially no longer playing in the Champions League. This marked a significant end of an era, as both Messi and Ronaldo not only had enjoyed periods of dominance and success in the competition for almost two decades, they were also the 1st (Ronaldo) and 2nd (Messi) highest scorers in the competition’s history. Due to the season’s break for the 2022 FIFA World Cup held in November and December, the group stages finished notably faster, ending on 1 November and 2 November.

Following the 2023-24 UEFA Champions League, Real Madrid won the title again by defeating Borussia Dortmund 2-0 in the final with goals of Dani Carvajal and Vinicius Júnior. To reach the final, Real Madrid had to beat current champions Manchester City in a dramatic quarter-final knockout which was decided in the penalty shootout, and then they faced FC Bayern Munich in a very evenly matched semifinals. Borussia Dortmund caused a surprise by reaching the final after beating PSG twice in the semifinals. This was the final reason which was played using the traditional group-stage format.

==== 2025 to 2026 – PSG's first title and dominance ====
The 2024–25 UEFA Champions League changed the format to a league phase format in which each team played against eight different opponents at random, four games at home and four games away. Each team faced two opponents from each of the four pots, one at home and one away. With this new format, the tournament was expanded from 32 to 36 teams. The top-eight clubs qualified automatically to the Round of 16, while the teams placed between ninth and twenty-fourth played an extra knockout round. Liverpool ended up in first place with 21 points after winning seven games and losing only one game, followed by Barcelona, Arsenal and Inter Milan with 19 points.

The Round of 16 faced Liverpool with PSG, which classified at 15th place and had to play an extra round against Stade Brestois 29. Liverpool won the first game in Paris 0-1, but PSG won 0-1 in the second leg in Anfield and then, beat Liverpool in the penalty shootout. PSG then proceeded to eliminate Aston Villa in quarter-finals and Arsenal in semifinals, to qualify to its second Champions League final where they faced Inter Milan, which reached the final after eliminating Bayern Munich FC in quarter-finals and Barcelona in a dramatic semifinal round with an aggregated 6-7 result. In the final, PSG won the match 5-0, achieving the biggest margin of victory within any of the European Cup finals. Coached by Luis Enrique, PSG achieved their first Champions League title, and the second title for France after Marseille in 1993. The achievement of winning European Cup led to the achievement of the sextuple, a feat only achieved by Barcelona in 2009 and Bayern Munich FC in 2020.

Following the 2025–26 UEFA Champions League season, Arsenal managed to reach the top spot in the league phase with a perfect record of eight wins and 24 points, followed by Bayern Munich with 21 points and only one lost game against Arsenal. However, like last season, PSG stormed the knockout phase after qualifying in 11th position in the league-phase. PSG eliminated Chelsea and Liverpool to face Bayern Munich FC in an intense semifinal round notable for the ultra-attacking football of both sides. PSG won 5-4 the first game while the second game ended in an 1-1 tie to reach their third European Cup final. Meanwhile Arsenal remained undeafeated in the tournament and reached their second European Cup final, eliminating both Sporting CP and Atletico Madrid by the narrowest margin. In the final game, Arsenal scored first with a goal of Kai Havertz but a penalty of Ousmane Dembélé equaled the result. In the end, the title was decided in the penalty shootout, where PSG won 4-3 to win their second European Cup title and become the second team in the Champions League era after Real Madrid to win in consecutive years.

== Evolution of the tournament format ==
The format of the competition has evolved substantially over the years, notably with the introduction of a Group Phase beginning in 1991, and multiple national representatives in 1998. The following summarises the evolution of the championship format through the years:

- 1955–1991: Knockout format; one club per country (the league champion) plus the defending champion
  - 1955: Some countries were represented by a team not the domestic champion
  - 1956–59: Domestic runner-up admitted in cases when the domestic champion was also European champion
- 1991–1993: Three knockout qualifying rounds; group phase with two groups; two group winners meet in final; one club per country (the league champion) plus the defending champion; In 1992–93 season, the European Cup was officially rebranded as UEFA Champions League
- 1993–1994: Knockout semi-finals added following group phase
- 1994–1997: One knockout qualifying round; group phase with four groups; group winners and runners-up to eight-team knockout phase; one club per country (the league champion) plus the defending champion
- 1997–1999: Two knockout qualifying rounds; group phase with six groups; group winners and best two runners-up to eight-team knockout phase; up to two clubs per country
- 1999–2003: Three knockout qualifying rounds; two group phases with eight first-phase group winners and runners-up moving to four second-phase groups; second-phase group winners and runners-up to eight-team knockout phase; up to four clubs per country
- 2003–2024: Three knockout qualifying rounds; one group phase with eight groups; group winners and runners-up to 16-club knockout phase; still up to four clubs per country (Note: In 2017, Manchester United became the fifth club from England; Sevilla (in 2015 and 2016) and Villarreal (in 2021) did the same for Spain (all four thanks to winning the UEFA Cup/Europa League). In 2005, Liverpool became the fifth club from England thanks to winning the Champions League. In 2000 and 2012, Spain and England were not allowed to enter five clubs: the winners of the Champions League, Real Madrid and Chelsea, who finished outside the top four in their leagues, replaced the fourth-placed Real Zaragoza and Tottenham Hotspur, who went to the UEFA Cup/Europa League.)
- Since 2009: UEFA introduced a play-off round in qualifying round of the Europa League and Champions League
- Since 2015: Additional berth for the Europa League winners; up to five clubs per country
- Since 2018: Automatic group stage berths for the Europa League winners without additional entries required followed with the group stage qualification format reforms (the top 4 clubs from the top 4 national associations automatically began to get into the group stage)
- Since 2021: UEFA abolished the away goal rules in all of the club competitions for the two-legged knockout stages and if the aggregate after both legs is drawn, a match must go through with extra time after the end of the 90-minute regulation and a penalty shoot-out if the aggregate remains unchanged after extra time to determine the winner of the tie. Prior to 1970, aggregate draws were settled by a play-off and (if necessary) coin-toss. Thereafter, it was via the away goals rule and (if necessary) a penalty shoot-out. The final retained the potential for a replay until the late 1970s.
- Since 2024: Partly in response to the attempt at the European Super League, UEFA decided on an extended format beginning with the 2024–25 season. The group stage evolves into a league stage in which the number of teams increases from 32 to 36. Every club plays a minimum of 8 league stage games against 8 different opponents (four home games, four away) instead of six matches against three teams, played on a home and away basis. Clubs that finish the league stage in 1st to 8th places automatically advance to the 16-club knockout stage, while clubs that finish in 9th to 24th places enter a two-legged play-off with the winners proceeding to the 16-club knockout. Clubs that finish in 25th to 36th places are automatically eliminated from the competition.

== List of participating nations by first entry ==
=== Including qualification rounds ===
Season	Nations
1955–56	Austria • Belgium • Denmark • France • Hungary • Italy • Netherlands • Poland • Portugal • Saar • Scotland • Spain • Sweden • Switzerland • West Germany • Yugoslavia
1956–57	Bulgaria • Czechoslovakia • England • Luxembourg • Romania • Turkey
1957–58	East Germany • Northern Ireland • Republic of Ireland
1958–59	Finland • Greece
1960–61	Norway
1961–62	Malta
1962–63	Albania
1963–64	Cyprus
1964–65	Iceland
1966–67	Soviet Union
1991–92	CIS
1992–93	Estonia • Germany • Israel • Latvia • Russia • Ukraine
1993–94	Belarus • Croatia • Faroe Islands • Georgia • Lithuania • Moldova • Slovenia • Wales
1994–95	Czech Republic
1997–98	Armenia • Azerbaijan • North Macedonia • Slovakia • FR Yugoslavia
2000–01	Bosnia and Herzegovina
2002–03	Kazakhstan
2003–04	Serbia and Montenegro
2006–07	Serbia
2007–08	Andorra • Montenegro • San Marino
2014–15	Gibraltar
2017–18	Kosovo

=== Group/league phase only ===
Since the addition of a group phase to the European Cup in the 1991–92 season, the earlier stages of the competition have been classified as qualifying rounds and from the 1994–95 season, all rounds prior to the group stage have been considered qualification rounds. The following nations have had representation at the group stage (league phase since the 2024–25 season) of the competition:

Season	Nations
1991–92	Belgium • CIS • Czechoslovakia • Greece • Italy • Portugal • Spain • Yugoslavia
1992–93	France • Netherlands • Russia • Scotland • Sweden
1993–94	Germany • Turkey
1994–95	Austria • Croatia • England • Romania • Ukraine
1995–96	Denmark • Hungary • Norway • Poland • Switzerland
1997–98	Czech Republic • Slovakia
1998–99	Finland
1999–2000	Slovenia
2002–03	Israel
2003–04	Serbia and Montenegro
2006–07	Bulgaria
2008–09	Belarus • Cyprus
2010–11	Serbia
2015–16	Kazakhstan
2017–18	Azerbaijan
2021–22	Moldova

== See also ==
- List of European Cup and UEFA Champions League finals
