= Jacques Ferran =

French journalist (1920–2019)

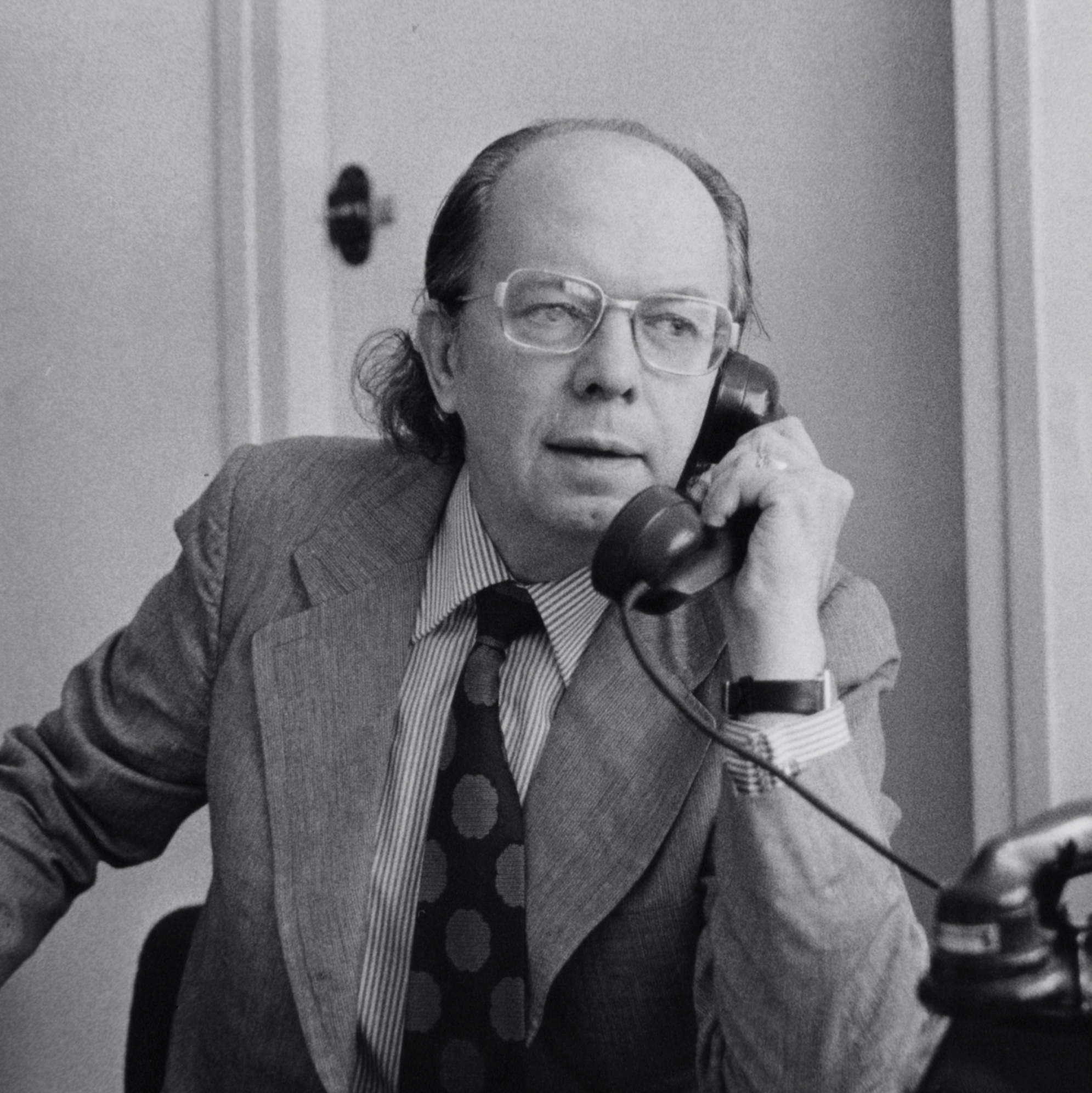
- Ferran in 1968
- Born: Jacques Marcel Albert Ferran; 30 March 1920; Montpellier, France
- Died: 7 February 2019 (aged 98); Paris, France
- Occupations: Sports journalist, writer, editor, drama critic, bridge player
- Years active: 1945–1985
- Known for: Co-creator of the European Cup and Ballon d'Or

Jacques Ferran (30 March 1920 – 7 February 2019) was a French sports journalist and author. He was the editor-in-chief at L'Equipe and the director of France Football. He contributed to the creation of the European Cup and the Ballon d'Or.

== Career ==
Ferran was born to Pierre Ferran, a magistrate, and Lucie, daughter of a Neapolitan goldsmith, Alberto Coppola, who immigrated and settled as a jeweler in Montpellier. In 1943, he escaped the STO and took refuge with his family in Aveyron. He later studied at the Faculty of Letters in the Paul Valéry University Montpellier, and had his first job experience at Tigre, a weekly newspaper created in 1945, then at Echo du Midi, a daily newspaper that quickly disappeared.

In 1948, he was hired by Jacques Goddet at L'Équipe, on the recommendation of Emmanuel Gambardella, President of the French Football Federation. He joined the football section, then directed by Jacques de Ryswick. In the meantime, the South American Championship of Champions, kicked off in 1948 after years of deliberation and organisation and set into motion the antecedent of the Copa Libertadores. Ferran became fascinated with the 1948 South American idea of a continental club competition. The UEFA document on the history of the European Cup confirms that Jacques Ferran and Gabriel Hanot, journalists for the French sports newspaper L'Équipe, were the founding fathers of the competition. In addition, Ferran drafted the first regulations and carried out the first draw for the inaugural season of the tournament.

In interviews to the Brazilian sports TV programme Globo Esporte in 2015 and Chilean newspaper El Mercúrio in 2018, Ferran said that the South American Championship of Champions was the inspiration for the European Cup:

How could Europe, which wanted to be ahead of the rest of the world, not be able to accomplish a competition of the same kind of the South American one? We needed to follow that example.

In addition, he collaborated as a dramatic critic with France Catholique from 1948 to 1953. In 1956, the Ballon d'Or award was introduced, when he was in the editorial staff of France Football. He also worked for ten years as a sports specialist at L'Express, which was founded by Jean-Jacques Servan-Schreiber and Françoise Giroud. In the 1970s, Ferran provided analysis in favor of the renovation of French football, which was adopted by the Federation President, Fernand Sastre. He kept working on the editorial staff of L'Équipe until his retirement in 1985. In February 1999, he was handed a trophy by Johan Cruyff for the most illustrious football journalist in the world, during a televised gala evening, organized at the Liceu by the International Football Hall of Champions.

On 7 February 2019, the newspaper L'Équipe announced his death, aged 98.

== Personal life ==
On 26 December 1942, Ferran married Colette Guye, with whom he had five children: Philippe, Catherine, Christine, Jean-Jacques and Pascale.

== Tribute ==
Michel Platini paid tribute to him:

I never considered Jacques Ferran as a journalist in the field, but as a football philosopher. He was a cerebral person who had a global reflection on our sport. He was above the fray.

—

== Honours ==
- Martini Award for Best Sports Article, 1968
- Henri Desgrange Prize (awarded by the Academy of Sports), 1970
- Knight of the Ordre national du Mérite
- Monegasque sports medalist
- Knight of the Legion of Honour, 1989
- IOC Centenary Medal, Lausanne, 1994
- UEFA Order of Merit in Emerald, 2004
- Lifetime Achievement Award (given by the Association of Sportswriters), 2006
- Gloire du sport, 2017

== See also ==
- Gabriel Hanot

== Sources ==
- Lafon, Andrée (2012). Retour à Rodez (in French). L'Harmattan. ISBN 978-2-296-57005-4.
