= Ligue de Football Professionnel =

French professional football league

- Country: France
- Confederation: UEFA
- Divisions: Ligue 1 Ligue 2
- Number of clubs: 36
- Level on pyramid: 1–2
- Relegation to: Championnat National 1
- Domestic cup: Coupe de la Ligue (folded)
- Current champions: Ligue 1: Paris Saint-Germain; Ligue 2: ESTAC Troyes (2025–26)
- Broadcaster(s): DAZN beIN Sports
- Website: www.lfp.fr
- Current: 2026–27 Ligue 1; 2026–27 Ligue 2

The Ligue de Football Professionnel (French pronunciation: [liɡ də futbol pʁɔfɛsjɔnɛl], Professional Football League), commonly known as the LFP, is a French league that runs the major professional football divisions in France and Monaco. It was founded in 1944 and serves under the authority of the French Football Federation. The current president of the league is Vincent Labrune. It is headquartered in Paris.

The league is responsible for overseeing, organizing, and managing the top two leagues in France, Ligue 1 and Ligue 2 and is also responsible for the 36 professional football clubs that contest football in France (both 18 in Ligue 1 and Ligue 2).

The league has encountered three major corruption scandals throughout its history: the Antibes scandal in 1933, the Red Star scandal in 1955, the Saint-Étienne scandal in 1982, and the Marseille scandal in 1993. Despite these scandals, the league has consistently maintained its reputation by swiftly and appropriately punishing the guilty parties.

== Foundation ==
The history of the Ligue de Football Professionnel dates back before World War II when the committee's primary motive was to ensure clubs in France pay players their wages. The chairman of the early predecessor of the league was Emmanuel Gambardella. Another committee, which monitored professional clubs and the status of professional players also existed during this time and was headed by Gabriel Hanot, who was later responsible for the creation of the European Cup, now the UEFA Champions League. During the Vichy regime, professionalism in France was abolished, which led to clubs forming unpopular regional amateur leagues. Under the current LFP hierarchy, the years 1939–1945 are non-existent.

Following the conclusion of the war, many clubs were hesitant to follow the initiatives of the French Football Federation due to their belief that the federation were not thinking in their best interests and, instead, opted to join an initiative by Gambardella referred the Groupement des clubs autorisés. On 27 October 1944, the Ligue Nationale de Football (National Football League) was officially founded with Gambardella being installed as the organization's first president. The league changed its name back to Groupement des clubs autorisés shortly after and kept the name until 1970 before returning to Ligue Nationale de Football. In 2002, the league changed its name to the Ligue de Football Professionnel.

== Mission ==
The Ligue de Football Professionnel describes itself through its mission statement. The LFP must:

- Organize, manage, and regulate all the aspects of professional football in France.
- Finance all operations or any actions that are likely to develop the resources of professional football in France.
- Apply the sanctions imposed by its authority organizations vis-à-vis members of sports clubs and its licenses and any other person bounded by these articles.
- To defend the moral and material interests of French football in France.

== Competition ==
=== League ===
The 36 member clubs of the LFP are grouped into two divisions: Ligue 1 and Ligue 2 (18 clubs, respectively). The LFP also oversee the professional clubs that suffer relegation to third-tier Ligue 3. Currently, there are six clubs playing in the third division that the league manages. In any given season a club plays each of the others in the same division twice, once at their home stadium and once at that of their opponents, though special circumstances may allow a club to host matches at other venues such as when Lille hosted Lyon at the Stade de France in 2007 and 2008. This makes for a total of 34 games played each season in both leagues.

Clubs gain three points for a win, one for a draw, and none for a defeat. At the end of each season, the club with the most points in Ligue 1 is crowned champion of France. Teams are ranked by total points, then goal difference, and then goals scored. If points are equal, the goal difference and then goals scored determine the winner. If still equal, teams are deemed to occupy the same position. If there is a tie for the championship, for relegation, or for qualification to other competitions, a play-off match at a neutral venue decides rank. The three lowest placed teams are relegated to Ligue 2 and the top three teams from Ligue 2 are promoted in their place.

=== Cup ===
The LFP also organized a cup competition, the Coupe de la Ligue. Before its foundation as an official league cup in 1994, the competition was a summer friendly tournament. Unlike the Coupe de France which allows all clubs, regardless of status, to enter, the Coupe de la Ligue only allowed professional clubs to participate. The competition was considered second-rate compared to the Coupe de France and attracted much criticism from many who deem the cup as having less prestige and creating fixture congestion.

== DNCG ==
The DNCG is the organisation responsible for monitoring the accounts of professional association football clubs in France. It was founded in 1984 and is an administrative directorate of the LFP. The current president of the DNCG is Richard Olivier. Along with the LFP, the DNCG has a public mission of service. The mission of the DNCG is to oversee all financial operations of the 40 member clubs of the LFP (as well as those clubs recently relegated to the Ligue 3), develop the resources of professional clubs, apply sanctions to those clubs breaking the rules of operation and to defend the morals and interests of French football in general.

== Presidents ==
Since the LFP's foundation, there have been a total of nine presidents who have served. The first president of the league was Emmanuel Gambardella who ran the organization from 1944 to 1953. His positive influence on French football led to the French Football Federation naming the country's prestigious under-19 youth cup tournament after him. The current president is Vincent Labrune, who was elected in 2020 and reelected in 2024.

President	Years
Emmanuel Gambardella	1944–1953
Georges Bayrou	1953
Paul Nicolas	1953–1956
Louis-Bernard Dancausse	1956–1961
Antoine Chiarisoli	1961–1967
Jean Sadoul	1967–1991
Noël Le Graët	1991–2000
Gérard Bourgoin	2000–2002
Frédéric Thiriez	2002–2016
Jean-Pierre Denis	2016
Nathalie Boy de la Tour	2016–2020
Vincent Labrune	2020–present

Presidents in italics served in an interim role.
