= Cyril Linette =

French sports journalist and business executive

- Born: 18 September 1970

Cyril Linette (born September 18, 1970, in Vouziers) is a French sports journalist and business executive. He was the director general of PMU from 2018 to 2021. Prior to that, he served as the director general of L'Équipe group from April 2015 to March 2018, and as the director of sports for Canal+ group for seven years.

== Biography ==
=== Studies ===
Cyril Linette attended Collège Jean Macé and Lycée Sévigné in Charleville-Mézières.

He holds degrees from the Institut d’études politiques de Paris and the École supérieure de journalisme de Lille.

=== Career ===
After a stint at RFO and two years at Eurosport, he joined Canal+ in 1996 as a sports journalist. He commentated on European matches, including the Premier League, Ligue 1 matches broadcast on Saturday afternoons, and hosted several shows. Additionally, he was a voice actor for the Pro Evolution Soccer games. In 2006, Linette was appointed deputy editor-in-chief for football. He held this position for a year and created the show Les Spécialistes on Canal+ Sport, which he also presented. In 2007, he became the football editor for Canal+ group's channels, notably developing Canal+ Sport with new programs such as Le 11 d'Europe. Following a tender by the Ligue de Football Professionnel to renew the Ligue 1 contract in February 2008, he set up Canal+’s new football offering centered around a Sunday evening show: the Canal Football Club was launched the following summer. Linette was appointed director of sports for the Canal+ group on June 18, 2008, replacing Alexandre Bompard. This division encompasses the sports editorial teams of Canal+ as well as thematic channels Sport+ and Infosport+.

He left the Canal+ group in February 2015 after being appointed director general of L'Équipe (daily newspaper, television channel, website). He took up his position on March 30, 2015. On September 18, 2015, the daily newspaper changed its format to a smaller "tabloid" size.

In March 2018, Cyril Linette left L'Équipe and became the director general of PMU a few weeks later. He initiated a new business strategy—reducing the range of races, focusing on horse racing bets, and leveraging the network of 13,200 sales points—as well as a cost-cutting plan. In January 2019, PMU returned to growth after six years of declining revenues. By the end of September 2020, Cyril Linette announced exceptional results achieved by PMU since the resumption of races on May 11, 2020. He attributed these results to the restart plan implemented during the COVID-19 lockdowns and the strategy initiated since the beginning of his tenure. In October 2021, he was dismissed after disagreements with the board.

On August 19, 2024, he announced his candidacy for the presidency of the Ligue de Football Professionnel.

He is considered to lead the organizing committee for the 2030 Winter Olympic and Paralympic Games.
