= Antoine Chiarisoli =

French association football administrator

President of the French Football Federation
- In office 1963–1968
- Preceded by: Pierre Pochonet
- Succeeded by: Jacques Georges

Personal details
- Born: 1903 Ajaccio, France
- Occupation: Football administrator

Antoine Chiarisoli (1903–?) was a French lawyer and sports administrator who served as president of the French Football Federation (FFF) from 1963 to 1968.

== Career ==
Originally form Ajaccio, Chiarisoli was a member of the Paris advocates' council during the 1950s. He became president of the Ligue de Football Professionnel on 5 May 1961, and in February 1963 he was elected president of the French Football Federation, a step toward uniting professional and amateur football.

In 1965, he negotiated with the ORTF for live television broadcasts of French championship matches on Saturday afternoons, typically two per month, marking one of the earliest regular TV agreements in French domestic football. The following year, he asked the president of the Paris city council to examine a project to enlarge the Parc des Princes stands, arguing that the stadium was too small for major events. He resigned from the presidency of the Ligue de Football Professionnel in March 1967, and Jean Sadoul succeeded him.

During the May 68, militant players and activists who occupied the FFF headquarters explicitly targeted Chiarisoli as a symbol of bourgeois and conservative leadership aligned with Gaullist authority, and as a result he did not stand for re-election.
