= FC Rapid București in European football =

Rapid București in European football
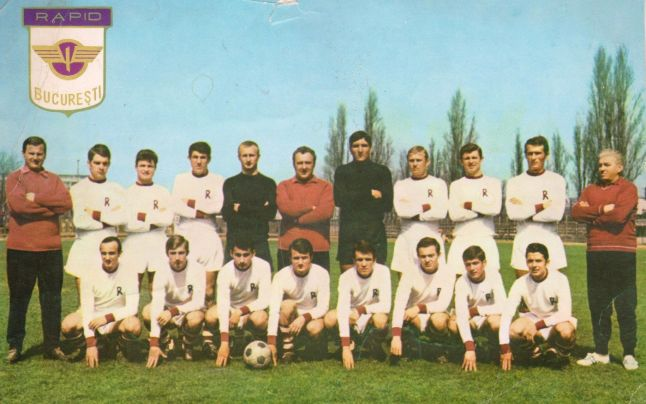
- Rapid București team in the 1966–67 season, in which they won their first national title.
- First entry: 1967–68 European Cup
- Latest entry: 2012–13 UEFA Europa League

Rapid București is a Romanian professional football club based in Bucharest, whose team has regularly taken part in Union of European Football Associations (UEFA) competitions. Qualification for Romanian clubs is determined by a team's performance in its domestic league and cup competitions. Steaua have regularly qualified for the primary European competition, the European Cup, by winning the Liga I. Rapid have also achieved European qualification via the Cupa României and have played in both the former UEFA Cup Winners' Cup and the UEFA Cup (now called the UEFA Europa League).

== European competitions ==
The first continental competition organised by UEFA was the European Cup in 1955. It is the most prestigious European competition and was conceived by the editor of L'Équipe Gabriel Hanot, as a competition for winners of the European national football leagues. The format of the competition was changed for the 1992–93 season to include a group stage instead of the straight knockout format previously in use. The competition was also renamed as the UEFA Champions League. Further changes were made for the 1997–98 season, with the runners-up from countries placed highly in the UEFA coefficients allowed to enter. This was later expanded to four team for the top countries in the coefficients.

A number of other European competitions have also taken place. The secondary cup competition is the UEFA Cup, which was established in 1972. The competition was initially open to teams who finished as runners-up in their respective national leagues. This was later expanded based on the countries rank in the coefficients and performance in domestic cup competitions. The competition was renamed as the UEFA Europa League for the 2009–10 season. The UEFA Cup Winners' Cup was a competition for the winners of all European domestic cup competitions. Established in 1960 it was considered the secondary cup competitions until the re-branding of the European Cup, which weakened the competition and it was considered the weakest of the three competitions. The competition was discontinued in 1999 and amalgamated into the UEFA Cup.

The UEFA Super Cup is a competition between the winners of the Champions League and Europa League. It was contested between the winners of the Champions League and Cup Winners' Cup up until the discontinuation of the latter in 1999. The competition was originally held over two-legs but was changed to a single match in 1998. The Inter-Cities Fairs Cup was established in 1955 and run independently of UEFA. It was initially for team from cities that hosted trade fairs, it was later expanded to include runners-up from the domestic leagues. In 1971, it came under the control of UEFA and was re-branded as the UEFA Cup. Established in 1960 the Intercontinental Cup was a competition for the winners of the European Cup and the South American equivalent the Copa Libertadores. Jointly organised by UEFA and the Confederación Sudamericana de Fútbol (CONMEBOL) it was contested until 2004, when it was replaced by the FIFA Club World Cup which included the winners of all six confederations regional championships.

== Total statistics ==
Including home match with Heerenveen.

Competition	S	P	W	D	L	GF	GA	GD
UEFA Champions League / European Cup	3	8	1	3	4	9	11	–2
UEFA Cup Winners' Cup / European Cup Winners' Cup	3	12	5	3	4	19	17	+2
UEFA Europa League / UEFA Cup	13	72	33	16	23	104	72	+32
UEFA Intertoto Cup	1	4	2	1	1	8	5	+3
Total	20	96	41	23	32	140	105	+35

== Statistics by country ==
Including home match with Heerenveen.

Country	Club	P	W	D	L	GF	GA	GD
Andorra	UE Sant Julià	2	2	0	0	10	0	+10
Subtotal		2	2	0	0	10	0	+10
Armenia	FC Mika	2	1	0	1	3	1	+2
Subtotal		2	1	0	1	3	1	+2
Austria	FK Austria Wien	1	0	1	0	1	1	0
Austria	SK Rapid Wien	2	1	1	0	4	2	+2
Subtotal		3	1	2	0	5	3	+2
Belgium	R. Charleroi S.C.	2	1	0	1	3	2	+1
Belgium	R.S.C. Anderlecht	4	1	1	2	3	5	–2
Subtotal		6	2	1	3	6	7	–1
Bosnia and Herzegovina	FK Sarajevo	2	1	0	1	2	1	+1
Subtotal		2	1	0	1	2	1	+1
Bulgaria	PFC Botev Plovdiv	2	1	0	1	3	2	+1
Bulgaria	PFC Lokomotiv Sofia	2	2	0	0	2	0	+2
Subtotal		4	3	0	1	5	2	+3
Czech Republic	FK Mladá Boleslav	1	0	1	0	1	1	0
Subtotal		1	0	1	0	1	1	0
England	Leeds United A.F.C.	2	0	0	2	1	8	–7
England	Liverpool F.C.	2	0	1	1	0	1	–1
England	Tottenham Hotspur F.C.	2	0	0	2	0	5	–5
Subtotal		6	0	1	5	1	14	–13
Finland	MYPA	2	2	0	0	5	1	+4
Subtotal		2	2	0	0	5	1	+4
France	Olympique Lyonnais	1	0	0	1	1	2	–1
France	Paris Saint-Germain F.C.	3	0	2	1	0	3	–3
France	Stade Rennais F.C.	1	1	0	0	2	0	+2
Subtotal		5	1	2	2	3	5	–2
Germany	1. FC Nürnberg	2	0	2	0	2	2	0
Germany	Eintracht Frankfurt	2	1	0	1	2	6	–4
Germany	Hamburger SV	2	1	0	1	3	3	0
Germany	Hertha BSC	2	2	0	0	3	0	+3
Germany	Karlsruher SC	2	1	0	1	2	4	–2
Germany	VfB Stuttgart	1	0	0	1	1	2	–1
Germany	VfL Wolfsburg	2	0	1	1	1	2	–1
Subtotal		13	5	3	5	14	19	–5
Greece	Panathinaikos	1	0	1	0	0	0	0
Greece	PAOK	1	1	0	0	1	0	+1
Subtotal		2	1	1	0	1	0	+1
Israel	Hapoel Tel Aviv F.C.	3	1	1	1	4	5	–1
Subtotal		3	1	1	1	4	5	–1
Italy	F.C. Internazionale Milano	2	0	0	2	1	5	–4
Italy	Juventus FC	2	0	1	1	0	1	–1
Italy	S.S.C. Napoli	2	1	0	1	2	1	+1
Subtotal		6	1	1	4	3	7	–4
Latvia	Skonto FC	2	0	1	1	4	5	–1
Subtotal		2	0	1	1	4	5	–1
Lithuania	FK Atlantas	2	2	0	0	12	0	+12
Subtotal		2	2	0	0	12	0	+12
Luxembourg	CS Grevenmacher	2	2	0	0	8	2	+6
Subtotal		2	2	0	0	8	2	+6
Malta	Sliema Wanderers F.C.	2	2	0	0	6	0	+6
Malta	Valletta FC	2	1	1	0	7	3	+4
Subtotal		4	3	1	0	13	3	+10
Netherlands	Feyenoord	2	1	1	0	2	1	+1
Netherlands	PSV Eindhoven	2	0	0	2	2	5	–3
Netherlands	SC Heerenveen	2	1	0	1	1	4	–3
Netherlands	Vitesse Arnhem	2	0	1	1	1	2	–1
Subtotal		8	2	2	4	6	12	–6
Norway	Vålerenga Fotball	2	0	2	0	2	2	0
Subtotal		2	0	2	0	2	2	0
Poland	Legia Warsaw	4	1	0	3	5	6	–1
Poland	Odra Wodzisław	1	1	0	0	4	2	+2
Poland	Śląsk Wrocław	2	1	1	0	4	2	+2
Subtotal		7	3	1	3	13	10	+3
Portugal	C.D. Nacional	2	2	0	0	3	1	+2
Subtotal		2	2	0	0	3	1	+2
(North Macedonia) Republic of Macedonia	FK Vardar	2	1	1	0	4	1	+3
Subtotal		2	1	1	0	4	1	+3
Romania	FC Steaua București	2	0	2	0	1	1	0
Subtotal		2	0	2	0	1	1	0
Slovakia	MŠK Žilina	1	1	0	0	2	0	+2
Subtotal		1	1	0	0	2	0	+2
Slovenia	ND Gorica	2	2	0	0	5	1	+4
Subtotal		2	2	0	0	5	1	+4
Sweden	Landskrona BoIS	2	1	0	1	3	1	+2
Subtotal		2	1	0	1	3	1	+2
Ukraine	FC Shakhtar Donetsk	1	1	0	0	1	0	+1
Subtotal		1	1	0	0	1	0	+1
Total		96	41	23	32	140	105	+35

== Statistics by competition ==
Notes for the abbreviations in the tables below:

- QR: Qualifying round
- PR: Preliminary round
- 1R: First round
- 2R: Second round
- 3R: Third round
- QF: Quarter-finals
- 1QR: First qualifying round
- 2QR: Second qualifying round
- 3QR: Third qualifying round
- PO: Play-off round
- R32: Round of 32
- R16: Round of 16

=== UEFA Champions League / European Cup ===
Season	Round	Club	Home	Away	Aggregate
1967–68	1R	(Bulgaria) Botev Plovdiv	3–0	0–2	3–2
1967–68	2R	(Italy) Juventus	0–0	0–1	0–1
1999–00	2QR	(Latvia) Skonto	3–3	1–2	4–5
2003–04	2QR	(Belgium) Anderlecht	0–0	2–3	2–3

=== UEFA Europa League / UEFA Cup ===
Season	Round	Club	Home	Away	Aggregate
1971–72	1R	(Italy) Napoli	2–0	0–1	2–1
1971–72	2R	(Poland) Legia Warsaw	4–0	0–2	4–2
1971–72	3R	(England) Tottenham Hotspur	0–2	0–3	0–5
1993–94	1R	(Italy) Internazionale	0–2	1–3	1–5
1994–95	PR	(Malta) Valletta	1–1	6–2	7–3
1994–95	1R	(Belgium) Charleroi	2–0	1–2	3–2
1994–95	2R	(Germany) Eintracht Frankfurt	2–1	0–5	2–6
1996–97	QR	(Bulgaria) Lokomotiv Sofia	1–0	1–0	2–0
1996–97	1R	(Germany) Karlsruhe	1–0	1–4	2–4
2000–01	QR	(Armenia) MIKA	3–0	0–1	3–1
2000–01	1R	(England) Liverpool	0–1	0–0	0–1
2001–02	QR	(Lithuania) Atlantas	8–0	4–0	12–0
2001–02	1R	(France) Paris Saint-Germain	0–3	0–0	0–3
2002–03	QR	(Slovenia) Gorica	2–0	3–1	5–1
2002–03	1R	(Netherlands) Vitesse	0–1	1–1	1–2
2005–06	1QR	(Andorra) Sant Julià	5–0	5–0	10–0
2005–06	2QR	(North Macedonia) Vardar	3–0	1–1	4–1
2005–06	1R	(Netherlands) Feyenoord	1–0	1–1	2–1
2005–06	Group stage (G)	(France) Rennes	2–0	N/A	1st place
2005–06	Group stage (G)	(Ukraine) Shakhtar Donetsk	N/A	1–0	1st place
2005–06	Group stage (G)	(Greece) PAOK	1–0	N/A	1st place
2005–06	Group stage (G)	(Germany) Stuttgart	N/A	1–2	1st place
2005–06	R32	(Germany) Hertha Berlin	2–0	1–0	3–0
2005–06	R16	(Germany) Hamburg	2–0	1–3	3–3 (a)
2005–06	QF	(Romania) Steaua București	1–1	0–0	1–1 (a)
2006–07	1QR	(Malta) Sliema Wanderers	5–0	1–0	6–0
2006–07	2QR	(Bosnia and Herzegovina) Sarajevo	2–0	0–1	2–1
2006–07	1R	(Portugal) Nacional	1–0	2–1 (aet)	3–1
2006–07	Group stage (G)	(France) Paris Saint-Germain	0–0	N/A	4th place
2006–07	Group stage (G)	(Israel) Hapoel Tel Aviv	N/A	2–2	4th place
2006–07	Group stage (G)	(Czech Republic) Mladá Boleslav	1–1	N/A	4th place
2006–07	Group stage (G)	(Greece) Panathinaikos	N/A	0–0	4th place
2007–08	1R	(Germany) Nürnberg	0–0	2–2	2–2 (a)
2008–09	1R	(Germany) Wolfsburg	1–1	0–1	1–2
2011–12	PO	(Poland) Śląsk Wrocław	1–1	3–1	4–2
2011–12	Group stage (C)	(Israel) Hapoel Tel Aviv	1–3	1–0	4th place
2011–12	Group stage (C)	(Netherlands) PSV Eindhoven	1–3	1–2	4th place
2011–12	Group stage (C)	(Poland) Legia Warsaw	0–1	1–3	4th place
2012–13	2QR	(Finland) MYPA	3–1	2–0	5–1
2012–13	3QR	(Netherlands) Heerenveen	1–0	0–4	1–4

=== UEFA Cup Winners' Cup / European Cup Winners' Cup ===
Season	Round	Club	Home	Away	Aggregate
1972–73	1R	(Sweden) Landskrona	3–0	0–1	3–1
1972–73	2R	(Austria) Rapid Wien	3–1	1–1	4–2
1972–73	QF	(England) Leeds United	1–3	0–5	1–8
1975–76	1R	(Belgium) Anderlecht	1–0	0–2	1–2
1998–99	QR	(Luxembourg) Grevenmacher	2–0	6–2	8–2
1998–99	1R	(Norway) Vålerenga	2–2	0–0	2–2 (a)

=== UEFA Intertoto Cup ===
Season	Round	Club	Home	Away	Aggregate
1997	Group stage (9)	(Poland) Odra Wodzisław	N/A	4–2	2nd place
1997	Group stage (9)	(Slovakia) Žilina	2–0	N/A	2nd place
1997	Group stage (9)	Austria Vienna	N/A	1–1	2nd place
1997	Group stage (9)	(France) Lyon	1–2	N/A	2nd place
