= Pierre Pochonet =

French association football administrator

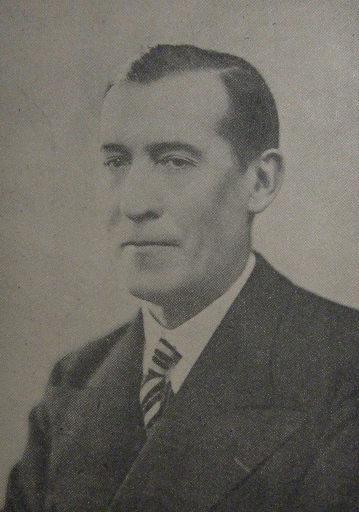

President of the French Football Federation
- In office 1953–1963
- Preceded by: Emmanuel Gambardella
- Succeeded by: Antoine Chiarisoli

Personal details
- Born: 9 August 1887 Reims, France
- Died: 15 August 1970 (aged 83) Paris, France
- Occupation: Football administrator

Pierre Pochonet (August 9, 1887 – August 15, 1970) was a French sports administrator who served as president of the French Football Federation (FFF) from 1953 to 1963.

== Biography ==
Pochonet was born in Reims on August 9, 1887. Before the World War I, he was involved in regional sports governance as a member of the committee of Racing Club de Reims and as the Champagne committee's delegate to the council of the Union des Sociétés Françaises de Sports Athlétiques (USFSA). During World War I, he volunteered for frontline service as a private soldier, serving from June 13, 1915 until the Armistice in 1918.

After the war, Pochonet played a key role in reorganizing regional football. In 1919, he founded the Reims Sports Association and the Champagne Football League. Three years later, in 1922, he became president of the newly created Northeast Football League, formed from the merger of the Champagne and Île-de-France leagues and encompassing six districts.

Pochonet chaired the French Cup Commission from 1919 to 1923. He joined the board of the French Football Federation in 1921, became its vice-president in 1942, and ultimately served as president from 1953 to 1963. He announced his resignation in December of the previous year, citing health concerns.

Pochonet died in Paris on August 15, 1970.

== Honours ==
- Officer of the Legion of Honor
- Commander of the Order of Nichan Iftikhar
- Knight of the Order of the Oak Crown
