= Emmanuel Gambardella =

French journalist (1888–1953)

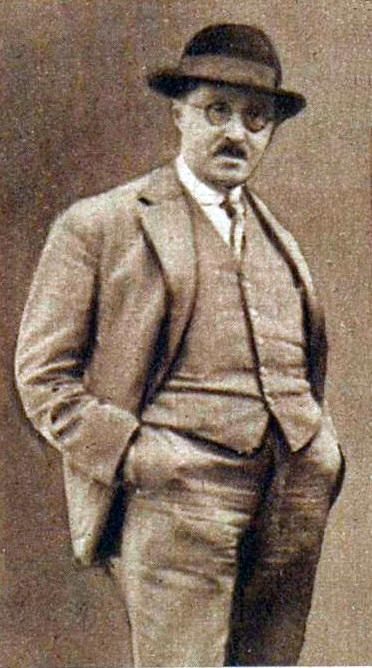
- Gambardella in 1929

President of the French Football Federation
- In office 1949–1953
- Preceded by: Jules Rimet
- Succeeded by: Pierre Pochonet

Personal details
- Born: Emmanuel Bonaventure Gambardella; 3 July 1888 Sète, France
- Died: 30 August 1953 (aged 65) Montpellier, France
- Occupation: Football player, journalist, sports executive, librettist

Emmanuel Gambardella (3 July 1888 – 30 August 1953) was a French sports journalist and author. He was the first president of the Ligue de Football Professionnel. His positive influence on French football led to the French Football Federation naming the country's prestigious under-18 youth cup tournament after him.

== Career ==
Gambardella who was born to a family of Italian origin studied at the municipal college of his hometown of Sète. At age 16, he participated in the establishment of AS Sétoise in 1904. In addition to playing football as a goalkeeper and being a secretary at his club, he joined the regional committee of the Union des Sociétés Françaises de Sports Athlétiques (USFSA) in 1909. In 1910–1912, he joined the French Army, and was recruited during the First World War (1914–1918), where he was transferred, due to physical deficiencies, to the health service between Perpignan and Amélie-les-Bains. Following the war, he became an administrative secretary of FC Sète, alongside Vice-president Georges Bayrou.

Later on, he commenced his career in journalism by writing the club's printed newsletter, Les dauphins, and the city's evening daily, L'information méridionale from February 1921. In May 1921, he worked at L'information sportive méridionale, then became the head of the editorial staff of the Languedocien sportif in Montpellier in 1922. In 1928–1930, he worked at Sports du Sud-Est in Nîmes. During the 1920s, he also worked as a librettist, but did not attract a large audience for the works outside Languedoc, with some exceptions in Nice during the summer of 1925. He also managed to succeed with an operetta in Bordeaux in 1923, but failed in Paris in 1928. In the meantime, he wrote for at least two magazines, Revue de Comoedia and Vous y Viendrez.

In 1929, he was assigned along with the journalist Gabriel Hanot, as an expert on the Commission d'étude formed by the French Football Federation Association (FFFA) to study players' status. His contributions led to the establishment of professionalism in 1932, then he became the chairman of the Commission du Championnat de France Professionnel, and vice-chairman of the classification and status commission for professional players. In 1930–1933, he tried in vain to launch a third newspaper in Montpellier, Le Sud, and worked for several Parisian newspapers such as Le Petit Méridional and Republican du Gard, then returned to Sports du Sud-Est in 1932 until its closure in 1938. In 1935, he chaired the union of professional journalists of Montpellier, and was awarded the title Knight of the Legion of Honor.

During the Second World War, Gambardella returned to L'information sportive méridionale, where he had to approve the Vichy regime policy of abandonment of professionalism. On 27 August 1944, he assumed the presidency of the board of directors of Midi Libre in Montpellier, and was responsible for the programs of the local radio station, in which he worked on the restoration of professional football, and the initiative to form the Groupement des clubs autorisés, following the conclusion of the war. In 1949, he became the President of the French Football Federation, succeeding Jules Rimet, until his death on 30 August 1953.

After his burial in the marine cemetery of Sète, his name was given in 1953 to the Coupe Nationale des Juniors, to be known as the Coupe Gambardella.

== Honours ==
- Knight of the Legion of Honor (1935)

== See also ==
- Gabriel Hanot

== Sources ==
- Dupont, Yves (1973). La mecque du football ou Mémoires d'un dauphin (in French). Nîmes. OCLC 461514033.
- Hare, Geoff; Dauncey, Hugh (2014). France and the 1998 World Cup: The National Impact of a World Sporting Event (in French). Taylor & Francis. ISBN 978-1-135-22869-9.
- Knipping, Franz; Dupeux, Louis; Hudemann, Rainer (2014). Eliten in Deutschland und Frankreich im 19. und 20. Jahrhundert/Elites en France et en Allemagne aux XIXème et XXème siècles. Band 2 (in French). Vol. 2. De Gruyter. ISBN 978-3-486-82908-2.
- Lewis, Robert W. (2016). The Stadium Century: Sport, Spectatorship and Mass Society in Modern France. Manchester University Press. ISBN 978-1-5261-0626-1.
