= Coupe Gambardella =

Football tournament in France

- Founded: 1955
- Region: France
- Teams: U18 French teams
- Current champions: Paris Saint-Germain (2nd title)
- Most championships: Auxerre (7 titles)
- Website: Coupe Gambardella – FFF

The Coupe Gambardella is a French football cup competition held between the under-18s of the French football clubs, organized by the French Football Federation (FFF).

The cup is regarded as an opportunity for young hopefuls to showcase their skills in a national competition. A victory in the finals of the cup is as sought by players trying to start their career, as by clubs wishing to demonstrate their ability to train young talents.

The current champion is Paris Saint-Germain having defeated Montpellier in the 2026 final by a score of 3–2. The 2019–20 and 2020–21 editions of the tournament were cancelled because of the COVID-19 pandemic in France.

== History ==
The tournament is the modern day version of the Coupe nationale des juniors, which ran up until 1954. The competition was then renamed, in 1955, to honour Emmanuel Gambardella, president of the French Football Federation from 1949 to 1953, who died on 30 August 1953.

In 2019, the competition switched from being an under-19 competition to an under-18 competition.

Chronology
| Period | Age category |
|---|---|
| 1955–1996 | Players turning 20 on or after 1 August of the year the competition ends |
| 1996–2002 | Players turning 18 on or after 1 January of the year the competitions ends |
| 2002–2019 | Players turning 19 on or after 1 January of the year the competitions ends |
| 2019–present | Players turning 18 on or after 1 January of the year the competitions ends |

== Format ==
The Coupe Gambardella begins in December, of the previous year of the final, at the regional level. Home advantage is given out randomly, until the semi-final stage when games are played at neutral venues. Games which are drawn after ninety minutes, go to a penalty shootout as opposed to extra time and then a shootout. The final is always played on the same day as the Coupe de France and have traditionally taken place at the Stade de France.

== List of finals ==
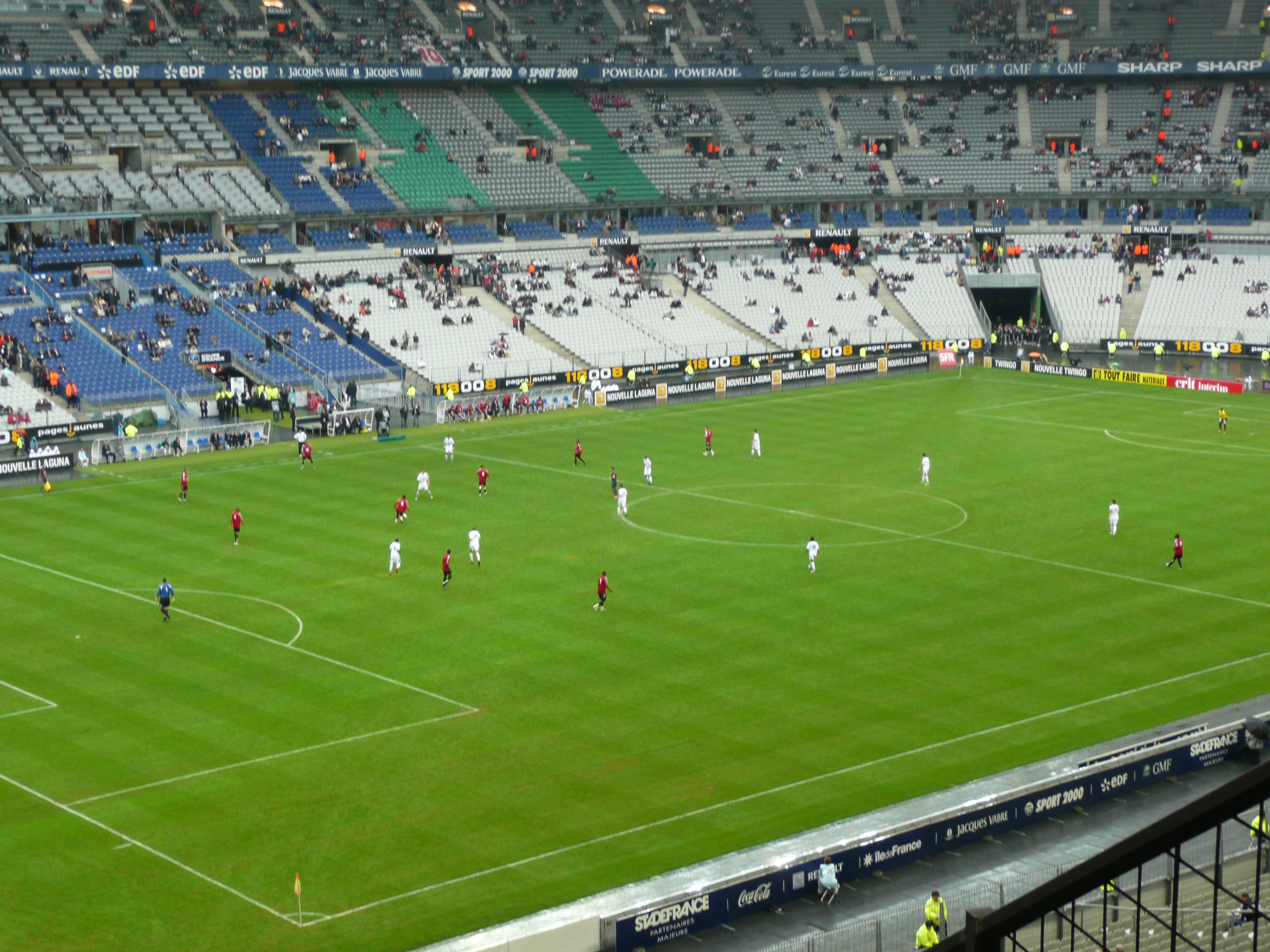
2007–08 final between Stade Rennais and Girondins de Bordeaux in the Stade de France.

| Season | Winners | Score | Runners–up |
|---|---|---|---|
| 1955 | Cannes | 3–0 | Lille |
| 1956 | Troyes | 2–1 | Reims |
| 1957 | Lens | 3–0 | Troyes |
| 1958 | Lens (2) | 2–1 | Saint-Étienne |
| 1959 | RC Paris | 1–0 | Caen |
| 1960 | Lille | 1–0 | Quevilly |
| 1961 | Nîmes | 2–0 | CO Joinville |
| 1962 | Monaco | 2–1 | Metz |
| 1963 | Saint-Étienne | 3–0 | Stade Français |
| 1964 | Reims | 4–3 | Saint-Étienne |
| 1965 | Strasbourg | 3–2 | Aix-en-Provence |
| 1966 | Nîmes (2) | 3–2 | Toulon |
| 1967 | Quevilly | 2–1 | Stade Français |
| 1968 | Martigues | 2–2* | Reims |
| 1969 | Nîmes (3) | 3–0 | Viry-Châtillon |
| 1970 | Saint-Étienne (2) | 3–3 † | Lyon |
| 1971 | Lyon | 2–1 | Saint-Étienne |
| 1972 | Monaco (2) | 2–1 | Toulouse |
| 1973 | Rennes | 1–1 † | AS Brest |
| 1974 | Nantes | 4–1 | Nancy |
| 1975 | Nantes (2) | 1–1 † | Sochaux |
| 1976 | Bordeaux | 3–0 | Viry-Châtillon |
| 1977 | Nîmes (4) | 3–1 | Reims |
| 1978 | INF Vichy | 3–1 | Paris Saint-Germain |
| 1979 | Marseille | 2–0 | Lens |
| 1980 | INF Vichy (2) | 1–0 | Metz |
| 1981 | Metz | 1–0 | Nice |
| 1982 | Auxerre | 6–3 | Nancy |
| 1983 | Sochaux | 1–0 | Lens |
| 1984 | Laval | 0–0 † | Montpellier |
| 1985 | Auxerre (2) | 3–0 | Montpellier |
| 1986 | Auxerre (3) | 0–0 † | Nantes |
| 1987 | RC Paris (2) | 2–1 | Grenoble |
| 1988 | INF Clairefontaine | 1–0 | Beauvais |
| 1989 | Le Havre | 0–0 † | Paris Saint-Germain |
| 1990 | Brest | 3–1 | Grenoble |
| 1991 | Paris Saint-Germain | 1–1 † | Auxerre |
| 1992 | Lens (3) | 1–0 | Lyon |
| 1993 | Auxerre (4) | 1–0 | Lens |
| 1994 | Lyon (2) | 5–0 | Caen |
| 1995 | Cannes (2) | 2–0 | Lens |
| 1996 | Montpellier | 1–0 | Nantes |
| 1997 | Lyon (3) | 1–1 † | Montpellier |
| 1998 | Saint-Étienne (3) | 1–1 † | Paris Saint-Germain |
| 1999 | Auxerre (5) | 0–0 † | Saint-Étienne |
| 2000 | Auxerre (6) | 1–0 | Lille |
| 2001 | Metz (2) | 2–0 | Caen |
| 2002 | Nantes (3) | 1–0 | Nice |
| 2003 | Rennes (2) | 4–1 | Strasbourg |
| 2004 | Le Mans | 2–0 | Nîmes |
| 2005 | Toulouse | 6–2 | Lyon |
| 2006 | Strasbourg (2) | 3–1 | Lyon |
| 2007 | Sochaux (2) | 2–2 † | Auxerre |
| 2008 | Rennes (3) | 3–0 | Bordeaux |
| 2009 | Montpellier (2) | 2–0 | Nantes |
| 2010 | Metz (3) | 1–1 † | Sochaux |
| 2011 | Monaco (3) | 1–1 † | Saint-Étienne |
| 2012 | Nice | 2–1 | Saint-Étienne |
| 2013 | Bordeaux (2) | 1–0 | Sedan |
| 2014 | Auxerre (7) | 2–0 | Reims |
| 2015 | Sochaux (3) | 2–0 | Lyon |
| 2016 | Monaco (4) | 3–0 | Lens |
| 2017 | Montpellier (3) | 1–1 † | Marseille |
| 2018 | Troyes (2) | 2–1 | Tours |
| 2019 | Saint-Étienne (4) | 2–0 | Toulouse |
| 2020 | Cancelled | – | |
| 2021 | Cancelled | – | |
| 2022 | Lyon (4) | 1–1 † | Caen |
| 2023 | Monaco (5) | 4–2 | Clermont |
| 2024 | Marseille (2) | 4–1 | Nancy |
| 2025 | Rennes (4) | 3–2 | Dijon |
| 2026 | Paris Saint-Germain (2) | 3–2 | Montpellier |

== Results by team ==
Teams shown in italics are no longer in existence.

| Club | Wins | First final won | Last final won | Runners-up | Last final lost | Total final appearances |
|---|---|---|---|---|---|---|
| Auxerre | 7 | 1982 | 2014 | 2 | 2007 | 9 |
| Monaco | 5 | 1962 | 2023 | 0 | — | 5 |
| Saint-Étienne | 4 | 1963 | 2019 | 6 | 2012 | 10 |
| Lyon | 4 | 1971 | 2022 | 5 | 2015 | 9 |
| Nîmes | 4 | 1961 | 1977 | 1 | 2004 | 5 |
| Rennes | 4 | 1973 | 2025 | 0 | — | 4 |
| Lens | 3 | 1957 | 1992 | 5 | 2016 | 8 |
| Montpellier | 3 | 1996 | 2017 | 4 | 2026 | 7 |
| Nantes | 3 | 1974 | 2002 | 3 | 2009 | 6 |
| Metz | 3 | 1981 | 2010 | 2 | 1980 | 5 |
| Sochaux | 3 | 1983 | 2015 | 2 | 2010 | 5 |
| Paris Saint-Germain | 2 | 1991 | 2026 | 3 | 1998 | 5 |
| Strasbourg | 2 | 1965 | 2006 | 1 | 2003 | 3 |
| Bordeaux | 2 | 1976 | 2013 | 1 | 2008 | 3 |
| Troyes | 2 | 1956 | 2018 | 1 | 1957 | 3 |
| Marseille | 2 | 1979 | 2024 | 1 | 2017 | 3 |
| INF Vichy | 2 | 1978 | 1980 | 0 | — | 2 |
| RC Paris | 2 | 1959 | 1987 | 0 | — | 2 |
| Cannes | 2 | 1955 | 1995 | 0 | — | 2 |
| Reims | 1 | 1964 | 1964 | 4 | 2014 | 5 |
| Lille | 1 | 1960 | 1960 | 2 | 2000 | 3 |
| Nice | 1 | 2012 | 2012 | 2 | 2002 | 3 |
| Quevilly | 1 | 1967 | 1967 | 1 | 1960 | 2 |
| Toulouse | 1 | 2005 | 2005 | 2 | 2019 | 3 |
| Martigues | 1 | 1968 | 1968 | 0 | — | 1 |
| Laval | 1 | 1984 | 1984 | 0 | — | 1 |
| INF Clairefontaine | 1 | 1988 | 1988 | 0 | — | 1 |
| Le Havre | 1 | 1989 | 1989 | 0 | — | 1 |
| Brest | 1 | 1990 | 1990 | 0 | — | 1 |
| Le Mans | 1 | 2004 | 2004 | 0 | — | 1 |
| Caen | 0 | — | — | 4 | 2022 | 4 |
| Stade Français | 0 | — | — | 2 | 1967 | 2 |
| Viry-Châtillon | 0 | — | — | 2 | 1976 | 2 |
| Nancy | 0 | — | — | 2 | 1982 | 2 |
| Grenoble | 0 | — | — | 2 | 1990 | 2 |
| CO Joinville | 0 | — | — | 1 | 1961 | 1 |
| Aix-en-Provence | 0 | — | — | 1 | 1965 | 1 |
| Toulon | 0 | — | — | 1 | 1966 | 1 |
| AS Brest | 0 | — | — | 1 | 1973 | 1 |
| Beauvais | 0 | — | — | 1 | 1988 | 1 |
| Sedan | 0 | — | — | 1 | 2013 | 1 |
| Tours | 0 | — | — | 1 | 2018 | 1 |
| Clermont | 0 | — | — | 1 | 2023 | 1 |
| Dijon | 0 | — | — | 1 | 2025 | 1 |
