= Daniel Roullier =

- Born: 14 November 1935 (age 90); Landébia, France
- Occupation: Businessman
- Known for: Founder, Groupe Roullier
- Children: 3+ daughters

Daniel Roullier (born 14 November 1935) is a French billionaire businessman, and the founder of Groupe Roullier, and agribusiness conglomerate.

== Early life ==
Daniel Roullier was born on 14 November 1935 in Landébia, France. He grew up in Saint-Malo, France.

== Career ==
In 1959, Roullier bought a seaweed deposit close to Saint-Malo, and founded Timac to convert this marine limestone into a soil conditioner. This company has expanded ever since and is now known as Groupe Roullier.

== Personal life ==
Roullier lives in St. Malo. One of his daughters have senior roles in the company.
