= Transpac =

Transpac may refer to:

- Transpacific Yacht Race
  - Transpac 52, sailing yacht
- The original name of Air Caledonie
- Transpac (cable system), one of a series of Pacific Ocean submarine communications cables
- Transpac (data network), French public data network from the late 1970s to the 1990s
- TransPAC2, part of the NSF’s International Research Network Connections (IRNC) program
