= Groupe Roullier =

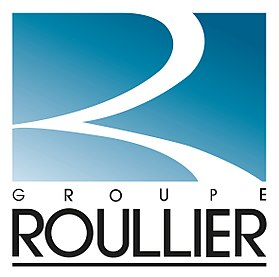
- Growing Together
- Industry: Agrosupplies, Feed Phosphates, Magnesium, Products & Solutions for Industry, Plastics Industry, Consumer Plant Nutrition, Food Industry
- Founded: 1959
- Founder: Daniel Roullier
- Headquarters: Saint-Malo, France
- Key people: Sébastien Chauffaut (Executive Board President), Yves Pelle (Supervisory board President), Danielle Cappe (General Manager)
- Revenue: € 2 billion (2019) – consolidated turn-over
- Owner: Roullier Family
- Number of employees: 8,200 (2019)
- Subsidiaries: Agriplas, Compagnie Armoricaine de Navigation, Maison Colibri, Florendi, TIMAC AGRO International, Ker Cadelac, Le Guillou, Magna, Timab Magnesium, Nuwen, Phosphea, Vitas
- Website: www.roullier.com

Groupe Roullier is a French agribusiness conglomerate founded in 1959 in Saint-Malo, France, by Daniel Roullier. The company specializes in the production and chemical processing of nutrients and feeds for plants, animals and humans. Groupe Roullier employs more than 8,000 people, its products are sold in 131 countries, with a consolidated turn-over of €2 billion.

== History ==
Groupe Roullier was established in 1959 in Saint-Malo, France, with the creation of a maerl grinding plant by the founder, Daniel Roullier. Maërl has been traditionally used by farmers in the Brittany region of France as a form soil amendment. First under the name TIMAC, the company was focused on the industrial processing of maerl. The business later became Groupe Roullier and included new offers of fertilizers, including maerl combinations with phosphate.

== Activities ==
Groupe Roullier is organized around seven types of activities: agrosupplies (especially fertilizers), phosphates for the animal food industry, magnesium, industrial products, consumer plant nutrition, plastics industry and the food industry. Agrosupplies are closely linked to plant nutrition through soil amendments to improve fertility, fertilizer products for plants, and root and leaf biostimulants that act on the physiological level of the plant.

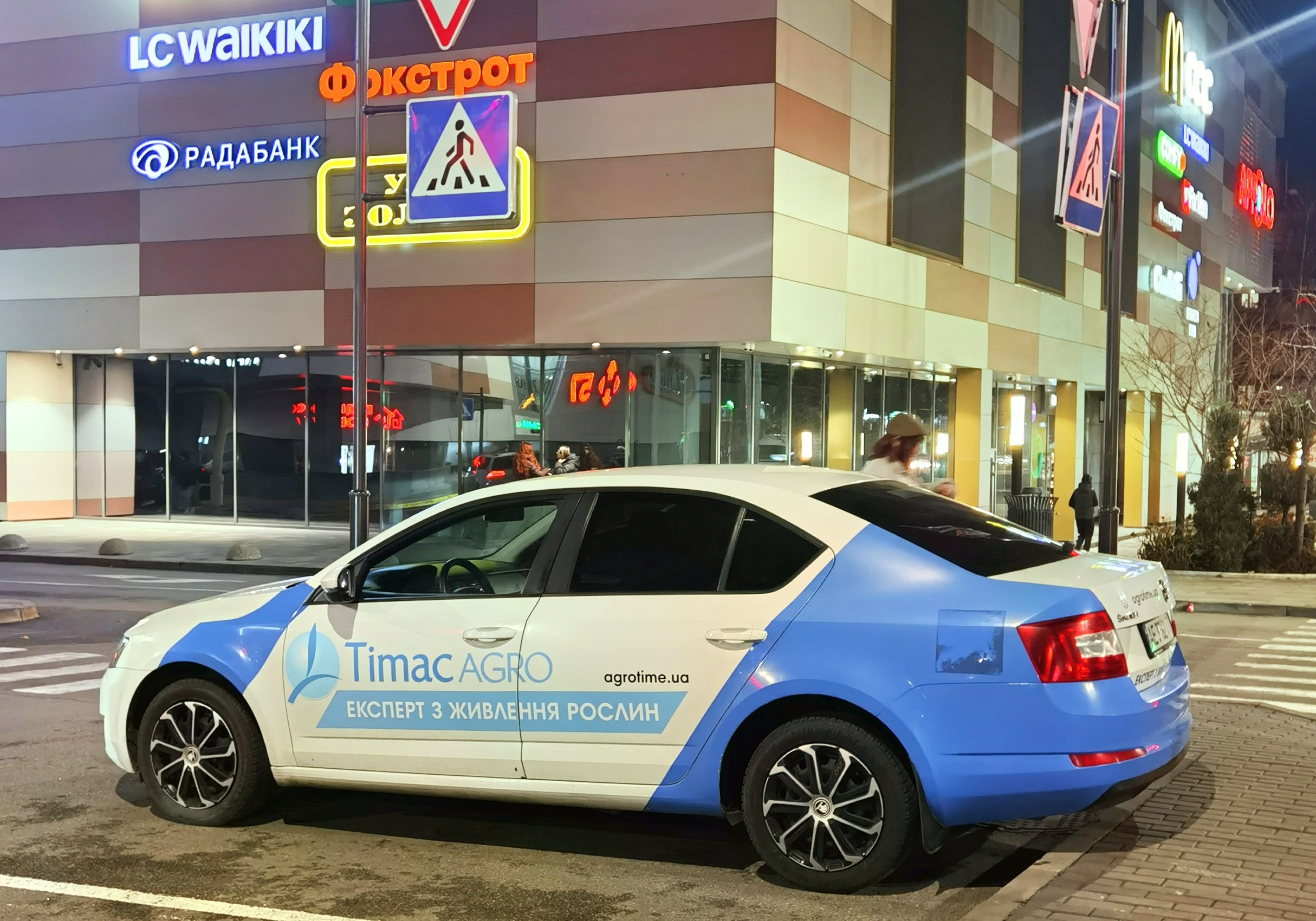
Timac Agro car

In the field of agrosupplies, Groupe Roullier has four subsidiaries: Timac Agro (fertilization and animal feed supplements), Grassland Agro (primarily based in Ireland), Vitas (Portuguese market) and William Houde (Canadian market). The transformation and production of phosphates is managed by one subsidiary, Phosphea, created in 1976. The production of magnesium is divided among three subsidiaries: Magnesitas Navarras, Magnesium do Brasil, Timab Magnesium.

Business activity also sand exploitation with subsidiary Compagnie Armoricaine de Navigation. One subsidiary manage business around industrial products : Nuwen; Florendi Consumer plant Nutrition and Plastics Industry with Agriplas.

Groupe Roullier has also invested in two food production companies for pastries and biscuits: Maison Colibri and Patisseries Gourmandes.

=== Business Development ===
Since its founding, the Groupe’s activities have expanded to include the distribution and marketing of its own activities, which led to investments in maritime transport and plastics processing. In 1988, Groupe Roullier launched its plastics business with Agriplas for the development of all packaging and containers for its agricultural supplies. At this time, Groupe Roullier also began developing products for animals, particularly food supplements. In the 2000s, Groupe Roullier announced a partnership with Louis Dreyfus to develop shipping activities for the transport of its own industrial products.

== International Development ==
Groupe Roullier was founded in Brittany, France, where some of the largest accumulations of maerl and other deposits exist at the international level. In the late 1970s, the business expanded to include activities in Europe, South America and North America.

=== United States ===
In 2017, Groupe Roullier announced the expansion of its activities in the US with the acquisition of A&E Ag, LLC and Circle R Fertilize, Inc, by its subsidiary TIMAC Agro USA. As of January 18, 2017, A&E Ag is now a subsidiary of Timac AGRO USA, Inc. and operates under the title A&E Ag – Timac Agro USA. Circle R Fertilize was founded in 1983 and sells liquid and dry fertilizer products, as well as crop protection products and seeds.

=== Brazil ===
The group sold its products in 131 countries, two-thirds of its employees work outside France, and it generates more than 50% of its turnover internationally.

== Research & Innovation ==
In 2005, Groupe Roullier created the Center for Applied Studies and Research (CERA) in Dinard, France. The center integrates an analytical laboratory and a small pilot plant to serve different subsidiaries in the improvement of industrial tools. In 2016, Groupe Roullier opened its Global Innovation Center (CMI) in Saint-Malo.

=== EIB Loan ===
In 2018, Groupe Roullier became the first company to benefit from the European Investment Bank financing for innovation in agriculture and the bioeconomy. The bank granted Groupe Roullier a EUR 50 million loan to finance its research and developed program to explore the use of microorganisms in plant and animal nutrition. The research activities will be carried out at the Roullier Global Innovation Center and the Centre for Studies and Applied Research. The new division was created to support work on bacterial flora in cattle rumen, the preservation and quality of silage, and biogas production from manure or silage.

=== Plant Nutrition Innovation Awards ===
Following the opening of the Roullier Global Innovation Center – CMI Roullier, the Group created a competition for innovation in plant nutrition. In 2018, Groupe Roullier awarded two researchers working in the field a total of EUR 120,000 with the purpose of promoting scientific collaboration and innovation to develop research activities in the fields of: plant nutrition, natural plant and marine substances, soil life and soil science, biostimulation and biocontrol as well as biotechnology and plant engineering. Each competition winner received EUR 60,000 to develop their own research project over the course of a year in collaboration with Groupe Roullier. Previous winners include: the team of professor Esquerreé-Tugayé’s from Toulouse University and the laboratory of electrophysiology at the University of Florence, Italy, in 2001, and the team from the Rothamsted Agricultural Research Center for its work on Sulphur transporters in cereals in 2005.

=== SUSFERT ===
Groupe Roullier is a member of the consortium for the SUSFERT project, which aims to develop multifunctional fertilizers for phosphorus and iron supply. The SUSFERT project plans to develop sustainable new sources for fertilizers to partly or fully replace existing sources.
