= Ricard Fernández =

Andorran footballer

Cucu
Personal information
- Full name: Ricard Fernández Betriu
- Date of birth: 19 March 1999 (age 27)
- Place of birth: Andorra la Vella, Andorra
- Height: 1.73 m (5 ft 8 in)
- Position: Forward

Team information
- Current team: Casa de Portugal
- Number: 99

Youth career
- 2015–2017: FC Andorra

Senior career*
Years	Team	Apps	(Gls)
2017–2020	FC Andorra	39	(4)
2020	→ Igualada (loan)	5	(0)
2020–2021	Formentera	30	(12)
2022	Andratx	10	(0)
2022–2023	San Cristóbal	24	(2)
2023	Bilje	15	(12)
2024	Krka	19	(3)
2025	UE Santa Coloma	15	(10)
2025	Tabor Sežana	10	(2)
2025–2026	UE Santa Coloma	11	(0)
2026–	Casa de Portugal	0	(0)

International career^{‡}
2014–2015	Andorra U17	6	(1)
2015–2017	Andorra U19	8	(2)
2016–2020	Andorra U21	28	(6)
2018–	Andorra	60	(2)
- * Club domestic league appearances and goals as of 10 May 2026 ‡ National team caps and goals as of 4 June 2026

Ricard Fernández Betriu (born 19 March 1999), also known as Cucu, is an Andorran footballer who plays for CE Casa de Portugal.

== International career ==
Fernández made his senior debut for the Andorra national football team in a 1–0 friendly win over Liechtenstein on 21 March 2018. He has remained in the under-21 set up since, however, notably scoring a brace in a shock 3–3 draw with England in October 2020, securing Andorra under-21s a rare point against a team featuring Premier League players such as Eddie Nketiah and Aaron Ramsdale. On 12 November 2021, he received a red card for elbowing Kamil Glik in the first minute of the match vs Poland, which Andorra went on to lose by a score of 1–4.

Fernández scored his first goal for Andorra on 12 October 2021 during a 3–0 win against San Marino during 2022 FIFA World Cup qualification, and the match subsequently became Andorra's first ever away victory.

Fernández scored his second goal for Andorra on 21 March 2024 during a 1–1 draw against South Africa during the 2024 FIFA Series: Algeria.

== International goals ==
No.	Date	Venue	Opponent	Score	Result	Competition
1.	12 October 2021	San Marino Stadium, Serravalle, San Marino	San Marino	3–0	3–0	2022 FIFA World Cup qualification
2.	21 March 2024	19 May 1956 Stadium, Annaba, Algeria	South Africa	1–0	1–1	2024 FIFA Series
