= Éric Vales =

Andorran footballer (born 2000)

Personal information
- Full name: Éric Vales Ramos
- Date of birth: 18 August 2000 (age 26)
- Place of birth: Andorra la Vella, Andorra
- Position: Centre-back

Team information
- Current team: Casa de Portugal
- Number: 6

Youth career
- –2018: FC Andorra
- 2018–2019: Atlètic Segre

Senior career*
Years	Team	Apps	(Gls)
2017–2018	FC Andorra	9	(1)
2019	Alcarràs	6	(0)
2019–2023	Tamarite	57	(0)
2023	Bilje	13	(0)
2024	Grindavík	17	(0)
2025	Ordino	7	(2)
2025	Tekstilac Odžaci	9	(0)
2025	Atlètic d'Escaldes	0	(0)
2026–	Casa de Portugal	0	(0)

International career^{‡}
2016	Andorra U17	3	(0)
2017–2018	Andorra U19	6	(0)
2018–2022	Andorra U21	6	(0)
2022–	Andorra	22	(0)
- * Club domestic league appearances and goals as of 3 November 2025 ‡ National team caps and goals as of 17 November 2025

Éric Vales Ramos (born 18 August 2000) is an Andorran footballer who plays as a centre-back for CE Casa de Portugal and the Andorra national team.

== International career ==
Vales made his international debut for Andorra on 16 November 2022, in a friendly match against Austria.

== Career statistics ==
=== International ===
As of 17 November 2025

Andorra
Year	Apps	Goals
2022	1	0
2023	10	0
2024	7	0
2025	4	0
Total	22	0
