= Eric de las Heras =

Andorran footballer (born 2002)

Personal information
- Full name: Èric de las Heras Izquierdo
- Date of birth: 13 January 2002 (age 24)
- Place of birth: Andorra la Vella, Andorra
- Height: 1.74 m (5 ft 8 1/2 in)
- Positions: Midfielder; right winger

Team information
- Current team: Socuéllamos
- Number: 21

Youth career
- 2010–2021: Gimnàstic de Tarragona

Senior career*
Years	Team	Apps	(Gls)
2021–2022	Pandurii Târgu Jiu		
2022–2023	Reus	18	(0)
2023–2026	Tamarite	62	(4)
2026–	Socuéllamos	0	(0)

International career^{‡}
2018	Andorra U17	3	(0)
2019	Andorra U19	3	(0)
2019–2024	Andorra U21	24	(1)
2024–	Andorra	16	(0)
- * Club domestic league appearances and goals as of 15 February 2026 ‡ National team caps and goals as of 15 November 2026

Èric de las Heras Izquierdo (born 13 January 2002) is an Andorran footballer who plays as a midfielder and right winger for Tercera Federación – Group 18 side UD Socuéllamos and the Andorra national team.

== Club career ==
De las Heras joined the youth teams of Gimnàstic de Tarragona when he was a child. In 2021, he joined Romanian Liga III side Pandurii Târgu Jiu, but his season was ruled over in April 2022, following an injury. In September 2022, shortly before Pandurii Târgu Jiu dissolved, he joined Primera Catalana side Reus FC Reddis.

In 2023, he signed for Tercera Federación side CDJ Tamarite. In July 2026, he signed for UD Socuéllamos.

== International career ==
De las Heras played for Andorra at youth level, making his debut with the under-17s in 2018. He made 24 appearances for the under-21 national team between 2019 and 2024, scoring his only goal against Malta, and serving as the team's captain.

He was first called up for the Andorra national team by Koldo Álvarez in September 2024. He went on to make his debut on 10 September, in a 1–0 defeat against Malta in League D of the 2024–25 UEFA Nations League. In total, he has made 14 appearances for the Andorra national team.
