= Álex Ruiz =

Association football player (born 1991)

Personal information
- Full name: Alexandre Henri Joaquim Ruiz Campagne
- Date of birth: 3 September 1991 (age 35)
- Place of birth: Pau, France
- Height: 1.86 m (6 ft 1 in)
- Position: Goalkeeper

Team information
- Current team: Casa de Portugal
- Number: 13

Youth career
- Lyon
- Real Sociedad

Senior career*
Years	Team	Apps	(Gls)
2010–2011	Real Sociedad B	0	(0)
2010–2011	→ Elgoibar (loan)	2	(0)
2011–2012	Portugalete		
2012–2014	Burgos	15	(0)
2014–2015	Castellón	13	(0)
2015–2016	Villarrobledo	36	(0)
2016–2017	Conquense	47	(0)
2017–2019	Gimnástica Torrelavega	57	(0)
2019–2020	Izarra	18	(0)
2020–2022	Atlètic d'Escaldes	51	(0)
2023	Sant Julià	10	(0)
2023–2025	UE Santa Coloma	39	(0)
2025–2026	FC Santa Coloma	19	(0)
2026–	Casa de Portugal	0	(0)

International career^{‡}
2025–	Andorra	4	(0)
- * Club domestic league appearances and goals as of 16 May 2026 ‡ National team caps and goals as of 29 May 2026

Alexandre Henri Joaquim Ruiz Campagne (born 3 September 1991) is a footballer who plays as a goalkeeper for Casa de Portugal of the Andorran Primera Divisió. Born in France, he made his international debut for Andorra in 2025.

== Club career ==
Born in Pau in the Pyrénées-Atlantiques department of France, Ruiz was a youth player for Olympique Lyonnais. At 14, he moved to Real Sociedad, having been scouted by Éric Olhats, who had also taken 13-year-old Antoine Griezmann from UF Mâconnais; the teenage pair lived together until Griezmann made his first-team debut.

After a season-long loan to CD Elgoibar, Ruiz left for Club Portugalete, also in the Tercera División. In August 2012 he signed for another fourth-tier club, Burgos CF, and at the end of January 2014, he transferred to CD Castellón.

Ruiz remained in the same division for the following seasons, with CP Villarrobledo, UB Conquense and Gimnástica de Torrelavega, joining the latter for family reasons in October 2017. He won promotion to the Segunda División B in his first season in Cantabria, and signed for CD Izarra in that league in June 2019.

In 2020, Ruiz moved to Andorra, where he represented Atlètic Club d'Escaldes, UE Sant Julià, UE Santa Coloma, FC Santa Coloma and CE Casa de Portugal in the Primera Divisió.

== International career ==
Ruiz was naturalised as an Andorran citizen by marrying a woman from that country. In September 2025, he was called up to the Andorra national team by manager Koldo Álvarez, for a 2026 FIFA World Cup qualifier away to England. His debut at age 34 was on 13 November in another qualifier, losing 1–0 at home to Albania.

== International statistics ==
As of match played 27 September 2026

Andorra
Year	Apps	Goals
2025	1	0
2026	3	0
Total	4	0
