= Gerard Solà =

Andorran footballer (born 2004)

Personal information
- Full name: Gerard Solà García
- Date of birth: 4 April 2004 (age 22)
- Place of birth: Andorra la Vella, Andorra
- Position: Forward

Team information
- Current team: Tudelano
- Number: 9

Youth career
- 2020–2021: Bordeta de Lleida
- 2021–2022: Atlètic Segre
- 2022–2023: Gimnàstic Manresa

Senior career*
Years	Team	Apps	(Gls)
2023–2024	Tamarite	29	(8)
2024–2025	Binéfar	34	(8)
2025–2026	Huesca B	29	(5)
2026–	Tudelano	1	(0)

International career^{‡}
2019	Andorra U17	3	(0)
2021–2022	Andorra U19	6	(0)
2021–	Andorra U21	23	(4)
2026–	Andorra	6	(0)
- * Club domestic league appearances and goals as of 14:54, 20 September 2026 (UTC) ‡ National team caps and goals as of 16:00, 15 November 2026 (UTC)

Gerard Solà García (born 4 April 2004) is an Andorran footballer who plays as a forward for Tudelano in the Spanish Segunda Federación.

== Club career ==
Born in Andorra la Vella, Solà began his senior career with CDJ Tamarite in Spain's fifth-tier Tercera Federación, scoring eight goals in 2023–24 before moving to CD Binéfar in the same division. For 2025–26, he joined SD Huesca B in the same league and also in Aragon. On 17 August 2026, he moved up to the Segunda Federación by signing for CD Tudelano.

== International career ==
On 18 November 2025, Solà captained Andorra under-21 to a 4–0 home win over the Republic of Ireland in 2027 UEFA European Under-21 Championship qualification. He scored twice, including a penalty kick, for a team that had won three times in their last 85 games. The following 27 March, in another qualifier at the Estadi Nacional, he scored against England, who required a last-minute penalty for a 1–1 draw.

Solà was first called up for the senior national team in May 2026, for friendlies against Iraq on 29 May 2026, in a 1–0 friendly loss to Iraq and Liechtenstein. He made his debut on 29 May against the former in Girona, Spain, as a 67th-minute substitute in a 1–0 loss.

== Personal life ==
His father Xavi Solà was a futsal player.
