= Jordi Aláez =

Andorran footballer and beach soccer player

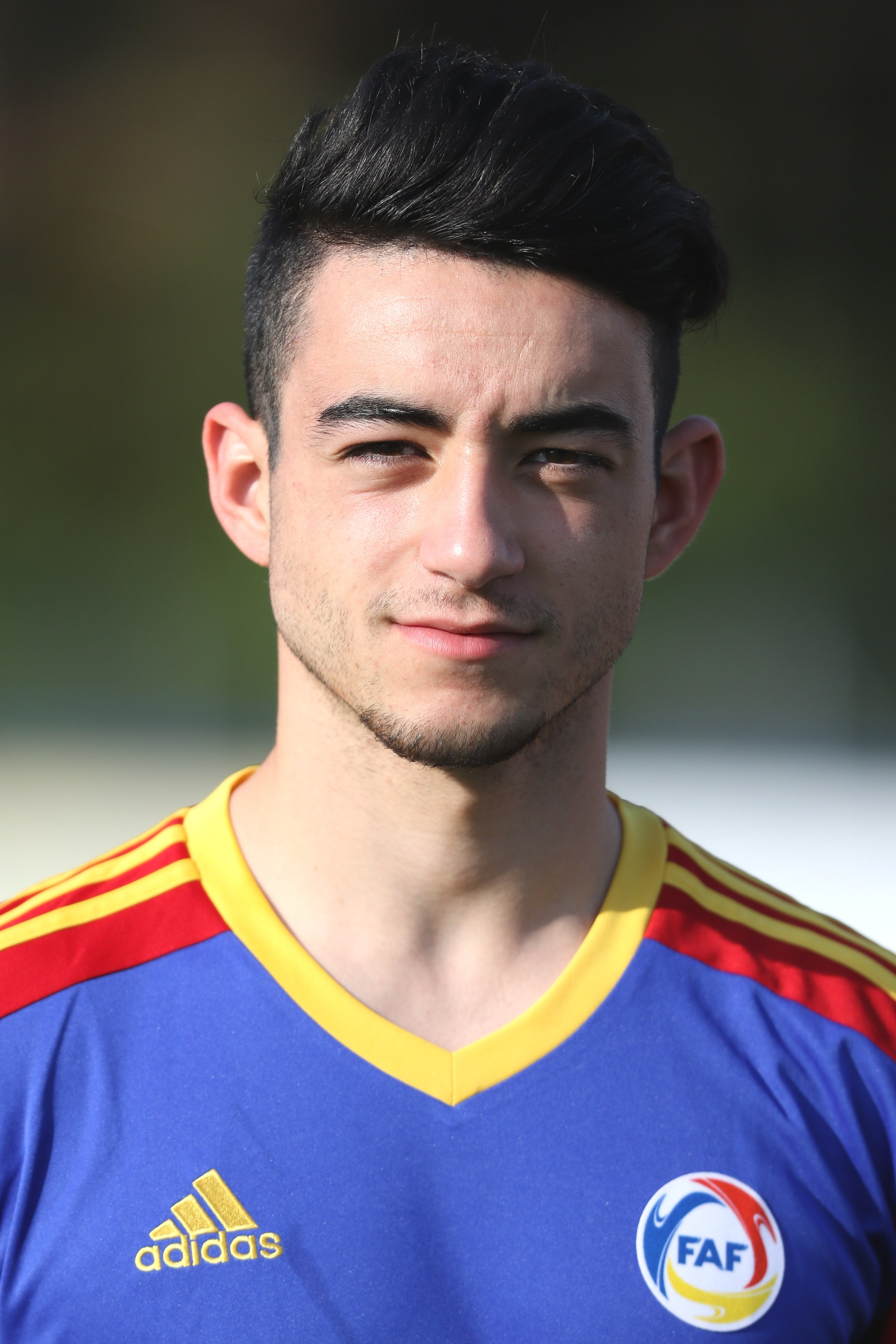
- Aláez in 2016

Personal information
- Full name: Jordi Aláez Peña
- Date of birth: 23 January 1998 (age 28)
- Place of birth: Sant Julià de Lòria, Andorra
- Position: Midfielder

Team information
- Current team: Atlètic d'Escaldes
- Number: 20

Youth career
- –2015: FC Andorra

Senior career*
Years	Team	Apps	(Gls)
2015–2019	FC Andorra		
2019–2020	FC Santa Coloma	16	(6)
2020–2021	Diagoras	22	(1)
2021–2022	Ciudad Real	19	(4)
2023	FC Santa Coloma	4	(1)
2023	Cerdanyola	8	(0)
2024	FC Santa Coloma	8	(4)
2024–2025	Inter d'Escaldes	1	(0)
2025–	Atlètic d'Escaldes	21	(1)

International career^{‡}
2013–2014	Andorra U17	6	(0)
2015–2016	Andorra U19	8	(0)
2015–2017	Andorra U21	13	(4)
2016–	Andorra (beach soccer)	2	(0)
2016–	Andorra	70	(4)
- * Club domestic league appearances and goals as of 17 May 2026 ‡ National team caps and goals as of 15 November 2026

Jordi Aláez Peña (born 23 January 1998) is an Andorran professional footballer who plays as a midfielder for Atlètic d'Escaldes and the Andorra national team.

== Playing career ==
=== Club career ===
Aláez quickly progressed through the youth ranks of FC Andorra, a club based in Andorra but playing in the Spanish football league system. As part of the "juvenile" (U18) team, he helped them achieve a near perfect season (25 wins, 3 draws, 1 loss) in 2014–15 to achieve promotion to the third-tier. He was called up to the first squad (playing in the fifth-tier Primera Catalana) before the start of the 2015–16 season. He made his debut less than a month after his 18th birthday, replacing Alexandre Martínez in the 79' of a 4–0 home win against UA Horta on 14 February 2016.

=== International career ===
==== Youth ====
Aláez made his debut for the Andorra national under-17 team in October 2013, playing all three matches in the 2014 Euro U17 qualifiers (against Serbia, Greece and Estonia, respectively). He was 15 years old. He subsequently captained Andorra U17 at the following year's qualifiers, recording one assist in three games as they failed to pass the group stage once again.

He also appeared in five matches for the Andorra national under-19 team, three times in the 2015 Euro U19 qualifiers in Poland and twice in the 2016 Euro 19 qualifiers in Romania.

His debut with the Andorra national under-21 team was on 26 March 2015, where he played the full 90 minutes in a 1–0 loss to the Republic of Ireland.

==== Senior ====
Aláez made his senior international debut for Andorra by playing the full 90 minutes of a 0–0 draw in a friendly against Azerbaijan on 26 May 2016. Aláez was among the four "fresh faces" with no previous senior international experience that manager Koldo Álvarez decided to include in the 18-man squad the day before the match, showing great confidence in the young players. He earned his second cap a week later, coming on as a 65th-minute substitute for Alexandre Martínez during a 2–0 loss to Estonia in Tallinn.

== National team statistics ==
As of match played 13 November 2026

Andorra
Year	Apps	Goals
2016	5	0
2017	7	0
2018	5	1
2019	10	0
2020	7	0
2021	11	0
2022	6	2
2023	7	0
2024	3	0
2025	1	0
2026	8	1
Total	70	4

=== International goals ===
Scores and results list Andorra's goal tally first.

No.	Date	Venue	Opponent	Score	Result	Competition
1.	9 September 2018	Estadi Nacional, Andorra la Vella, Andorra	Kazakhstan	1–1	1–1	2018–19 UEFA Nations League D
2.	25 March 2022	Estadi Nacional, Andorra la Vella, Andorra	Saint Kitts and Nevis	1–0	1–0	Friendly
3.	10 June 2022	Estadi Nacional, Andorra la Vella, Andorra	Liechtenstein	1–0	2–1	2022–23 UEFA Nations League D
4.	4 June 2026	Estadi de la FAF, Encamp, Andorra	Liechtenstein	2–0	2–0	Friendly
