= Eric de Pablos =

Andorran footballer

Personal information
- Full name: Eric de Pablos Solà
- Date of birth: 8 March 1999 (age 27)
- Place of birth: Andorra la Vella, Andorra
- Position: Right-back

Team information
- Current team: Rànger's
- Number: 22

Youth career
- –2018: FC Andorra

Senior career*
Years	Team	Apps	(Gls)
2018–2019	FC Andorra	14	(0)
2019	Ordino	14	(0)
2019–2020	UE Santa Coloma	17	(0)
2020–2021	FC Santa Coloma	12	(0)
2021–2024	UE Santa Coloma	58	(3)
2024–2025	Pas de la Casa	21	(0)
2025–2026	UE Santa Coloma	24	(2)
2026–	Rànger's	0	(0)

International career^{‡}
2014–2015	Andorra U17	4	(0)
2016–2017	Andorra U19	5	(0)
2016–2020	Andorra U21	15	(0)
2021–	Andorra	14	(0)
- * Club domestic league appearances and goals as of 10 May 2026 ‡ National team caps and goals as of 29 May 2026

Eric de Pablos Solà (born 8 March 1999) is an Andorran footballer who plays as a right-back for FC Rànger's and the Andorra national team.

== Career ==
De Pablos made his international debut for Andorra on 3 June 2021, coming on as a substitute in the 73rd minute for Moisés San Nicolás in a friendly match against the Republic of Ireland. The home match finished as a 4–1 loss.

== Career statistics ==
=== International ===
As of 29 May 2026

Andorra
Year	Apps	Goals
2021	3	0
2022	4	0
2023	2	0
2024	2	0
2025	2	0
2026	1	0
Total	14	0
