= Josep Gómes =

Andorran footballer (born 1985)

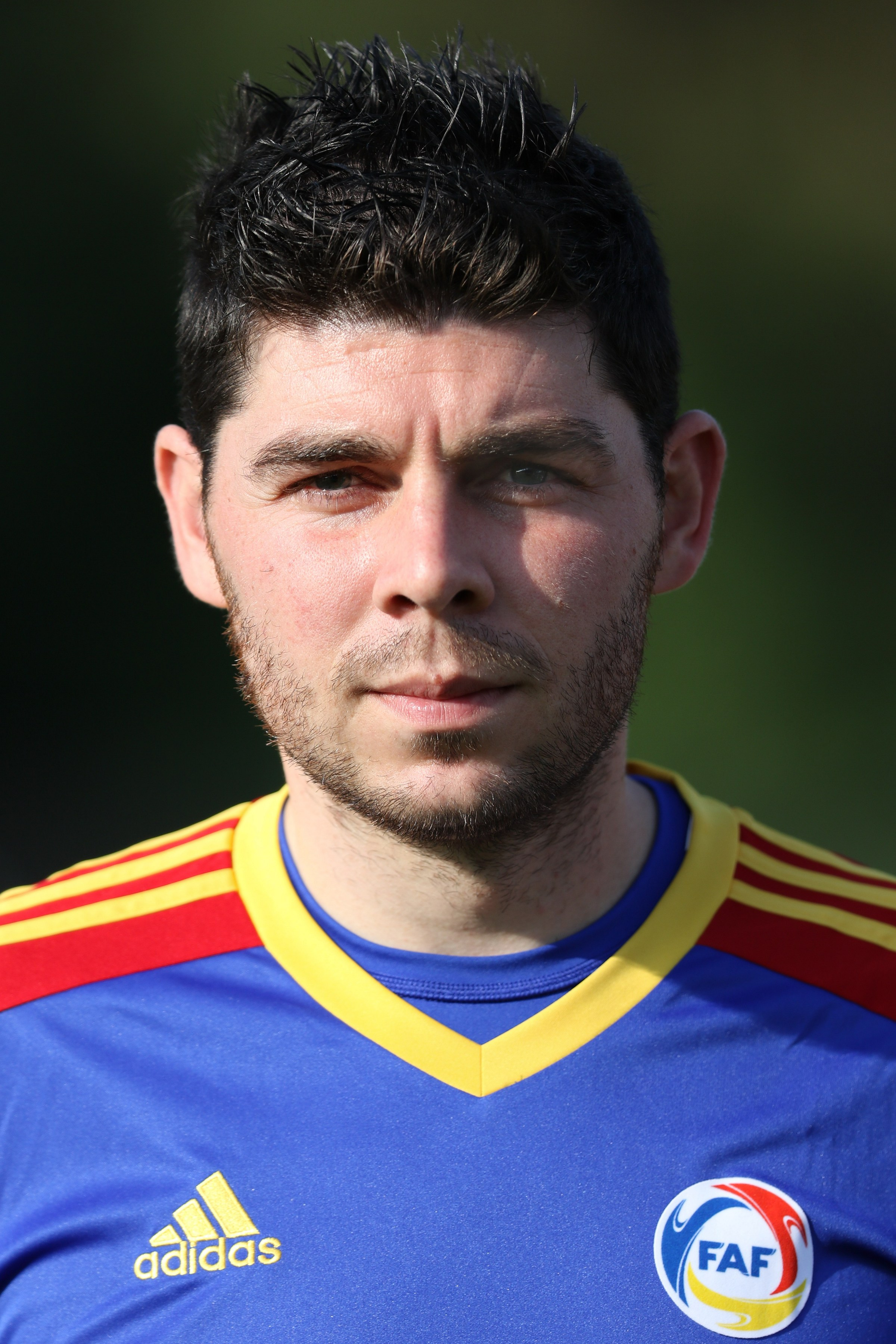
- Gómes representing the Andorra national team in 2016

Personal information
- Full name: Josep Antoni Gómes Moreira
- Date of birth: 3 December 1985 (age 40)
- Place of birth: La Massana, Andorra
- Height: 1.80 m (5 ft 11 in)
- Position: Goalkeeper

Team information
- Current team: Casa de Portugal
- Number: 1

Senior career*
Years	Team	Apps	(Gls)
2004–2006	FC Andorra	5	(0)
2006–2009	Eivissa	47	(0)
2009–2010	Ciudad Vícar	17	(0)
2010–2011	San Rafael	33	(0)
2011–2012	Carabanchel	0	(0)
2012–2014	Fortuna	44	(1)
2014–2015	Pennoise	2	(1)
2015	UE Santa Coloma	7	(0)
2015–2017	Illescas	59	(0)
2017–2018	Villaverde San Andrés	6	(0)
2018–2019	UE Santa Coloma	26	(0)
2019–2022	Inter d'Escaldes	66	(0)
2022–2025	FC Santa Coloma	33	(0)
2025–2026	La Massana	12	(0)
2026–	Casa de Portugal	5	(0)

International career^{‡}
2006	Andorra U21	2	(0)
2006–	Andorra	88	(0)
- * Club domestic league appearances and goals as of 17 May 2026 ‡ National team caps and goals as of 31 March 2026

Josep Antoni Gómes Moreira (born 3 December 1985) is an Andorran international footballer who plays as a goalkeeper for Casa de Portugal.

== Career ==
Born in La Massana, Gómes spent most of his club career playing in the Spanish league system, representing FC Andorra, UD Ibiza-Eivissa, CD Ciudad de Vícar and CF San Rafael.

He made his international debut for Andorra in 2006, and has represented them in FIFA World Cup qualifying matches.

On 25 March 2019, during a UEFA Euro qualifying match against Albania, Gómes made what one sports website described as a "howler" that gifted Albania the opening goal when he tried an acrobatic flying kick to clear the ball but failed to do so. His team went on to lose 3–0.
