= Albert Reyes (footballer) =

Andorran footballer

Personal information
- Full name: Albert Reyes Roig
- Date of birth: 24 March 1996 (age 30)
- Place of birth: Escaldes-Engordany, Andorra
- Height: 1.74 m (5 ft 9 in)
- Position: Midfielder

Team information
- Current team: Ordino
- Number: 8

Youth career
- 2012–2015: Andorra

Senior career*
Years	Team	Apps	(Gls)
2015–2017	Encamp	24	(3)
2017–2018	Sant Julià	17	(0)
2018–2019	FC Andorra	11	(1)
2019–2021	Inter d'Escaldes	18	(0)
2021–2023	UE Santa Coloma	50	(0)
2024–2025	Ordino	34	(1)
2025–	Casa de Portugal	0	(0)

International career^{‡}
2011–2012	Andorra U17	6	(0)
2012–2014	Andorra U19	9	(0)
2014–2018	Andorra U21	18	(0)
2020–	Andorra	5	(0)
- * Club domestic league appearances and goals as of 18 May 2025 ‡ National team caps and goals as of 24 March 2025

Albert Reyes Roig (born 24 March 1996) is an Andorran footballer who plays as a midfielder for Casa de Portugal and the Andorra national team.

== Career ==
Reyes made his international debut for Andorra on 7 October 2020 in a friendly match against Cape Verde, which finished as a 1–2 home loss.

== Career statistics ==
=== International ===
As of 24 March 2025

Andorra
Year	Apps	Goals
2020	1	0
2022	3	0
2024	1	0
Total	5	0
