= Miluir Macedo =

Brazilian footballer

Personal information
- Full name: Manoel Miluir Macedo Cunha
- Date of birth: 15 April 1948 (age 78)
- Place of birth: Pedro Avelino, Brazil

Youth career
- 1966: Pederneiras
- 1967: Rabello

Senior career*
Years	Team	Apps	(Gls)
1968	Rabello		
1969	Carioca		
1970	Coenge		
1970	Carioca		
1971	Minas Brasília		

Managerial career
- 1984–1986: ASBAC (youth)
- 1987–1988: Os Marialvas
- 1988: Estrela da Calheta
- 1988–1994: Sporting CP (youth)
- 1994–1995: Sporting de Luanda
- 1995–1996: O Elvas
- 1997: Happy Valley
- 1997–1999: Andorra
- 1999–2000: Puebla (assistant)
- 2000: Cintra Yaoundé
- 2000–2001: Freamunde
- 2002: Juan Aurich
- 2002: Brasília
- 2003–2004: Potiguar Mossoró
- 2004–2005: Ajman
- 2005: Baraúnas
- 2005: América de Natal
- 2006: Potiguar Mossoró
- 2007: Baraúnas
- 2007–2008: Al Urooba
- 2008: Potiguar Mossoró
- 2010: ASSU
- 2011: Cruzeiro-DF
- 2012: Tigres do Brasil
- 2013: Potiguar Mossoró
- 2013–2014: Al Wasl U20
- 2018: Boa Esporte U20
- 2019: Capital U20
- 2021: Mossoró
- * Club domestic league appearances and goals

Manoel Miluir Macedo Cunha (born 15 April 1948 in Pedro Avelino) is a Brazilian professional football manager.

== Career ==
From June 1997 until March 1999 he coached the Andorra national football team. In 2013, he was a head coach of the ACD Potiguar de Mossoró.
