= Reinaldo Ahumada =

Chilean footballer (born 1997)

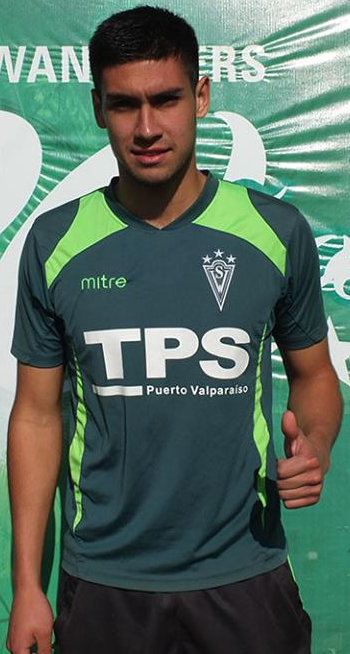
- Ahumada with Santiago Wanderers in 2014

Personal information
- Full name: Reinaldo Manuel Ahumada Cisternas
- Date of birth: 30 May 1997 (age 29)
- Place of birth: Valparaíso, Chile
- Height: 1.84 m (6 ft 0 in)
- Position: Centre-back

Team information
- Current team: Casa de Portugal

Youth career
- Santiago Wanderers

Senior career*
Years	Team	Apps	(Gls)
2014–2019	Santiago Wanderers	30	(3)
2018	→ Trasandino (loan)	8	(0)
2020–2021	Lautaro de Buin	32	(2)
2022–2023	Deportes Melipilla	21	(1)
2023–2024	Lautaro de Buin	24	(1)
2024	Unión San Felipe	1	(0)
2024	Persiku Kudus	7	(0)
2025	Trasandino	8	(0)
2025–2026	Penya Encarnada	17	(0)
2026–	Casa de Portugal	0	(0)
- * Club domestic league appearances and goals as of 15 June 2026

Reinaldo Manuel Ahumada Cisternas (born 30 May 1997) is a Chilean professional footballer who plays as a centre-back for Primera Divisió club Casa de Portugal.

== Club career ==
As a youth player, Ahumada was with Santiago Wanderers in his city of birth, Valparaíso. A member of the Santiago Wanderers first team in 2014. At professional level, he has played for several clubs in Chilean football.

=== Unión San Felipe ===
In January 2024, he officially signed a contract with Unión San Felipe. He made his league debut on 24 February 2024, played as a substituted in a 2–0 lose against Curicó Unido. Ahumada finished the season with only one appearance, and he left the club at August 2024 and move to Indonesia.

=== Persiku Kudus ===
On 30 August 2024, Ahumada was signed for Persiku Kudus to play in Liga 2 in the 2024–25 season.

=== Andorran football ===
In the second half of 2025, Ahumada moved to Europe and joined Andorran club Penya Encarnada. The next season, he switched to Casa de Portugal.
