= Àlex Martínez (footballer, born 1998) =

Andorran footballer and beach soccer player

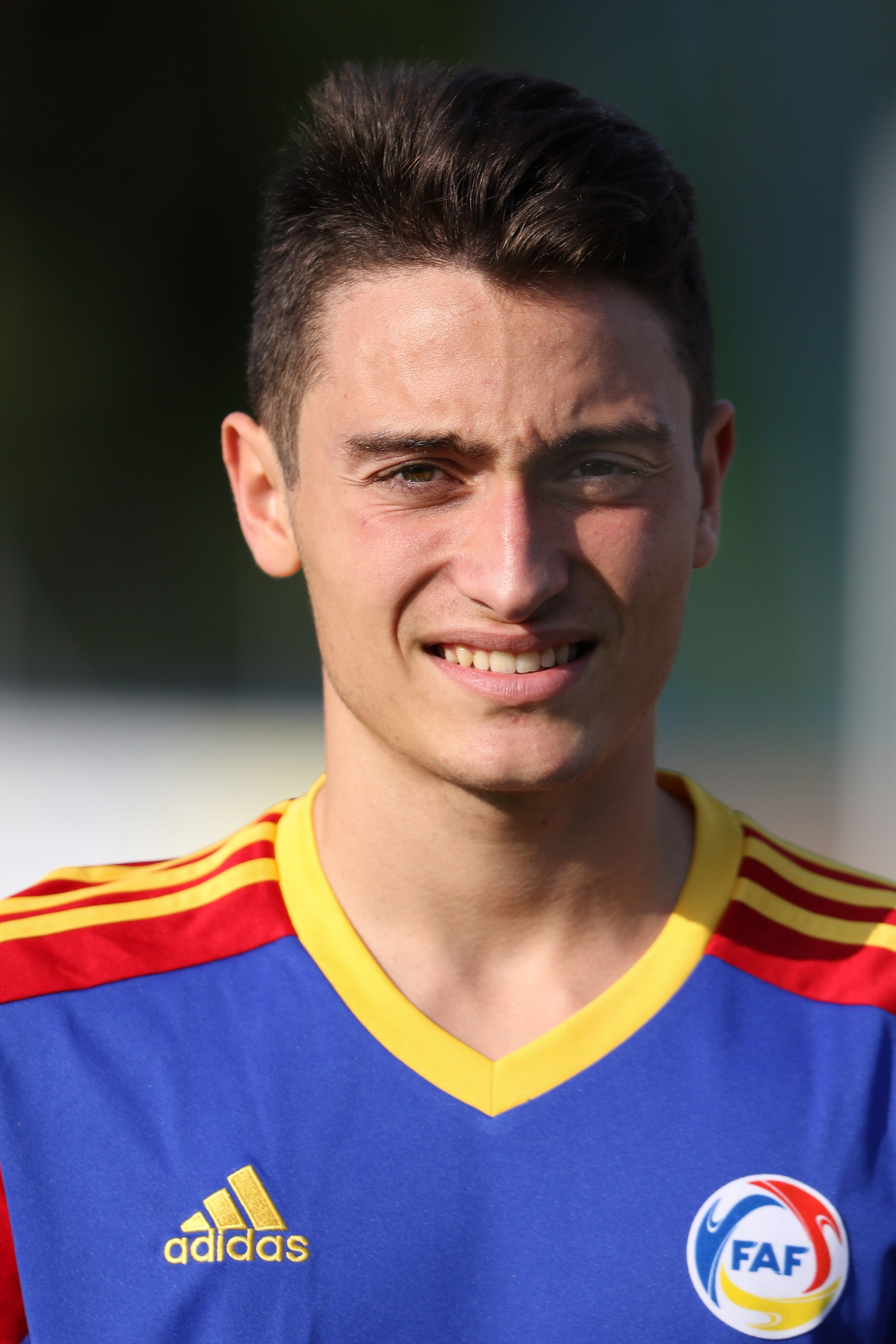
- With Andorra in 2016

Personal information
- Full name: Alexandre Martínez Palau
- Date of birth: October 10, 1998 (age 28)
- Place of birth: Andorra la Vella, Andorra
- Height: 1.84 m (6 ft 0 in)
- Position: Forward

Team information
- Current team: Atlètic d'Escaldes
- Number: 16

Youth career
- Sant Julià
- –2015: UE Santa Coloma
- 2015–: FC Andorra

Senior career*
Years	Team	Apps	(Gls)
2013–2015	UE Santa Coloma B	25	(34)
2014–2015	UE Santa Coloma	3	(0)
2015–2021	FC Andorra	76	(4)
2020–2021	→ FC Santa Coloma (loan)	11	(4)
2021–2023	Atlètic d'Escaldes	29	(6)
2023–2024	La Solana	20	(3)
2024–2026	UE Santa Coloma	17	(4)
2026–	Atlètic d'Escaldes	0	(0)

International career^{‡}
2013–2014	Andorra U17		
2015–2016	Andorra U19	6	(2)
2016–2020	Andorra U21	9	(0)
2016–	Andorra (beach soccer)	2	(1)
2016–	Andorra	67	(2)
- * Club domestic league appearances and goals as of 4 October 2026 ‡ National team caps and goals as of 10 May 2026

Alexandre "Àlex" Martínez Palau (born 10 October 1998) is an Andorran footballer and beach soccer player who plays for Atlètic Club d'Escaldes and the Andorra national football team.

== International goals ==
Scores and results list Andorra's goal tally first.

Goal	Date	Venue	Opponent	Score	Result	Competition
1.	10 October 2016	Estadi Nacional, Andorra la Vella, Andorra	Switzerland	1–2	1–2	2018 FIFA World Cup qualification
2.	4 June 2026	Estadi de la FAF, Encamp, Andoraa	Liechtenstein	1–0	2–0	Friendly
