= Izan Fernández =

Andorran footballer (born 2008)

Personal information
- Full name: Izan Fernández Vieitez
- Date of birth: 3 October 2001 (age 25)
- Place of birth: Andorra la Vella
- Height: 1.72 m (5 ft 8 in)
- Position: Forward

Team information
- Current team: Rànger's
- Number: 14

Youth career
- –2020: FC Andorra

Senior career*
Years	Team	Apps	(Gls)
2018–2021	FC Andorra	3	(0)
2020–2021	→ Mollerussa (loan)	14	(2)
2021–2022	Tàrrega	18	(2)
2022–2023	Atlético Monzón	28	(4)
2023–2024	Azuqueca	22	(1)
2024–2026	Binéfar	35	(2)
2026–	Rànger's	0	(0)

International career^{‡}
2017–2018	Andorra U17	6	(0)
2019–2020	Andorra U19	4	(0)
2021–2023	Andorra U21	18	(0)
2022–	Andorra	15	(0)
- * Club domestic league appearances and goals as of 8 March 2026 ‡ National team caps and goals as of 27 March 2026

Izan Fernández Vieitez (born 3 October 2001) is an Andorran footballer who plays as a forward for FC Rànger's and the Andorra national team.

== Club career ==
A youth product of FC Andorra, he played three games for the club in the Primera Catalana and one in the Copa Catalunya. During the 2019–20 season he played for their subsidiary team which achieved promotion to Tercera Catalana. He joined Primera Catalans side CFJ Mollerussa in October 2020 when he was 19 years-old. He signed for UE Tàrrega in 2021.

He joined Aragon based outfit Atlético Monzón in the summer of 2022. He scored his first goal for the club on 4 December 2022, in a 2–1 home league win against fellow Aragon side CD La Almunia. He left Atletico Monzon and signed for CD Azuqueca, based in Azuqueca de Henares, in July 2023. He scored his first goal for the club on 7 October 2023 against CF La Solana.

He joined Spanish club CD Binéfar the Tercera Federación in the summer of 2024. He scored his first goal for the club in a 2–0 home league win against CD Fuentes on 26 October 2024. His efforts for the club included scoring a goal in a 3–1 win against CD Cuarte in the league on 1 December 2024 to help move his club to the top of their division.

== International career ==
Fernández is a full international for the Andorra national team, making his debut on 16 November 2022 against Austria. He was called-up again to the Andorra national team in November 2024.

== Style of play ==
He is described as an attacking player, who is able to play wide on either wing, but also centrally as a striker.
