= Pau Babot =

Andorran footballer (born 2003)

Personal information
- Full name: Pau Klaus Babot Müller
- Date of birth: 20 August 2003 (age 23)
- Place of birth: Frankfurt, Germany
- Height: 1.82 m (6 ft 0 in)
- Position: Midfielder

Team information
- Current team: Bayern Alzenau
- Number: 17

Youth career
- –2013: FC Germania Enkheim
- 2013–2016: FSV 1910 Bergen
- 2016–2022: KSV Klein-Karben

Senior career*
Years	Team	Apps	(Gls)
2022–2023	SG Bornheim Grün-Weiss	41	(5)
2024–2025	Hanauer SC 1960	40	(3)
2025–2026	Rot-Weiß Walldorf	22	(1)
2026–	Bayern Alzenau	0	(0)

International career^{‡}
2019	Andorra U17	3	(0)
2019–2021	Andorra U19	6	(0)
2021–2024	Andorra U21	18	(0)
2024–	Andorra	17	(0)
- * Club domestic league appearances and goals as of 23 May 2026 ‡ National team caps and goals as of 4 October 2026

Pau Klaus Babot Müller (born 20 August 2003) is a footballer who plays as a midfielder for FC Bayern Alzenau in Germany's Regionalliga. Born in Germany, he is an Andorra international.

== Early life ==
Babot was born on 1 August 2003 in Germany to an Andorran mother and a German father. Growing up, he attended the Schule am Ried in Germany. He can speak Catalan and Spanish.

== Club career ==
As a youth player, Babot joined the youth academy of FC Germania Enkheim. Three years later, he joined the youth academy of FSV 1910 Bergen, before joining the youth academy of KSV Klein-Karben, where he captained the under-14 team. In 2022, he started his career with SG Bornheim Grün-Weiss. Ahead of the second half of the 2023–24 season, he signed for Hanauer SC 1960.

== International career ==
Babot played for the Andorra national under-17 football team for 2020 UEFA European Under-17 Championship qualification. The same year, he played for the Andorra national under-19 football team. On 19 October 2024, he debuted for the Andorra national football team during a 0–0 away draw with the Malta national football team in the UEFA Nations League.
