= Remolins =

Remolins is a Catalan surname, originally derived from a nickname. A family bearing the name placed their ancestral seat or was established in Urgell. Notable people with the surname include:

- Francisco de Remolins (1462–1518), Spanish cardinal
- Ot Remolins (born 2004), Andorran footballer

== See also ==
- Remoulins, town in France
