= Albert Reyes =

Albert Reyes may refer to:

- Albert Reyes (director) (1941–1992), Mexican-born American theatre director and producer, playwright, educator, businessman, and producer and director for radio and television
- Albert Reyes (footballer) (born 1996), Andorran footballer
- Albert Reyes (fl. 2010s–2020s), the CEO of Buckner International
- Albert Reyes, a character in the 2023 film The Naughty Nine
