= David Rodrigo =

Spanish football manager (born 1968)

Personal information
- Full name: David Andrés Rodrigo Lo
- Date of birth: 8 May 1968 (age 58)
- Place of birth: Lleida, Spain

Team information
- Current team: FS Massalcoreig (president)

Managerial career
- Years: Team
- 1992–1995: Lleida (youth)
- 1995–1999: Binéfar
- 1999–2010: Andorra
- 2006–2008: Andorra U21

David Andrés Rodrigo Lo (born 8 May 1968) is a Spanish football manager. He is the president of futsal club FS Massalcoreig, and was previously in charge of the Andorra national football team.

== Coaching biography ==
Sports teacher by education Rodrigo started his coaching career as a youth coach for UE Lleida. Then he moved to CD Binéfar in the third Spanish league. With Rodrigo as coach the team earned promotion to the second league and won a regional cup, he was offered to become the head coach of the Andorra national team.

Rodrigo brought a new organisational structure to the team and organised a youth team. Still the team had to wait for several years for the first win in a competitive game. Only in the 2006 FIFA World Cup qualifying game against Macedonia the single goal by Marc Bernaus gave Andorra its first and historic win. It was followed by another success for the Andorra team - a draw in Macedonia. Andorra also earned one draw against Finland.

In order to combat Andorra's inevitably poor results, he developed highly defensive tactics for the team. As commentator David Pleat described: "They will literally park the bus (in front of goal)".

== Controversy ==
In September 2006 Rodrigo drew the ire of many when he reportedly told Israel captain Yossi Benayoun that Israel was a "nation of killers" and threatened to have Benayoun's legs broken. Andorra midfielder Juli Fernandez offered his apologies to Benayoun on behalf of his team. Rodrigo has denied making these comments. The Andorran government could take action against Rodrigo if he is found guilty.
