= Hugo Ferreira (footballer) =

Andorran footballer (born 2004)

Personal information
- Full name: Hugo Ferreira da Silva
- Date of birth: 12 July 2004 (age 22)
- Place of birth: Encamp, Andorra
- Position: Midfielder

Team information
- Current team: Europa B

Youth career
- 2021–2022: FC Andorra

Senior career*
Years	Team	Apps	(Gls)
2021–2023	FC Andorra B	29	(2)
2023–2024	Esperança	29	(2)
2024–2026	FC Santa Coloma	54	(1)
2026–	Europa B	0	(0)

International career^{‡}
2021	Andorra U19	1	(0)
2024–	Andorra U21	12	(1)
2026–	Andorra	6	(0)
- * Club domestic league appearances and goals as of 19:27, 20 September 2026 (UTC) ‡ National team caps and goals as of 16:00, 15 November 2026 (UTC)

Hugo Ferreira da Silva (born 12 July 2004) is an Andorran footballer who plays as a midfielder for the Andorra national team.

== Club career ==
Born in Encamp, Ferreira was a youth player at FC Andorra and made his senior debut with the reserve team in the Segona Catalana. After one season with CF Esperança d'Andorra in 2023–24, he joined FC Santa Coloma in the same league. On 17 July 2025, in the first qualifying round of the UEFA Conference League against FK Borac Banja Luka of Bosnia and Herzegovina, he was sent off in a 2–0 home loss in the second leg, though his team still advanced.

== International career ==
On 18 November 2025, Ferreira scored for Andorra under-21 to a 4–0 home win over the Republic of Ireland in 2027 UEFA European Under-21 Championship qualification. His team had won three times in their last 85 games.

Ferreira was first called up for the senior national team for a 1–0 home loss to Moldova in the UEFA Nations League on 16 November 2024. His debut came on 13 November 2025, in a defeat by the same score to Albania in 2026 FIFA World Cup qualification, as a substitute for the last four minutes.
