= Biel Borra =

Andorran association football player (born 2005)

Personal information
- Full name: Biel Borra Font
- Date of birth: 22 October 2005 (age 21)
- Place of birth: Barcelona, Spain
- Height: 1.83 m (6 ft 0 in)
- Position: Right back

Team information
- Current team: Olot
- Number: 22

Youth career
- Porqueres
- Banyoles
- Girona

Senior career*
Years	Team	Apps	(Gls)
2024–2025	L'Escala	28	(1)
2025–2026	Vilassar de Mar	29	(0)
2026–	Olot	0	(0)

International career^{‡}
2022–2023	Andorra U19	5	(1)
2022–	Andorra U21	11	(0)
2024–	Andorra	20	(0)
- * Club domestic league appearances and goals as of 10 May 2026 ‡ National team caps and goals as of 15 November 2026

Biel Borra Font (born 22 October 2005) is a footballer who plays as a right back for Spanish Segunda Federación club UE Olot. Born in Spain, he made his debut for the Andorra national team in 2024.

== Club career ==
Born in Barcelona to a father from Andorra and a mother from Banyoles in the Province of Girona, Borra grew up in Banyoles. He began playing football aged 3 at UE Porqueres, then CE Banyoles, before joining the youth ranks of Girona FC at age 12.

After six years, Borra left Girona without making the first team, and signed for FC L'Escala. In 2025, he signed for UE Vilassar de Mar, also in the fifth-tier Tercera Federación. After making 29 appearances, he moved up one division to UE Olot in the Segunda Federación in July 2026.

== International career ==
Borra represented the Andorra national under-19 team from the age of 16. On 21 November 2023, he scored an equaliser in a 2–1 comeback win against hosts Bulgaria in the last game of 2024 UEFA European Under-19 Championship qualification, overtaking Bulgaria to third place and one point off qualification to the next round.

Borra's debut for the under-21 team came at the age of 17 on 23 November 2022, in a 2–1 friendly loss away to Malta.

On 3 September 2024, manager Koldo Álvarez called Borra up to the senior team for a friendly away to Gibraltar the next day. He made his debut aged 18 by starting in the 1–0 loss at Europa Point Stadium.

== Personal life ==
As of 2025, Borra was studying a marketing degree through the Open University of Catalonia.

== International statistics ==
As of match played 13 November 2026

Andorra
Year	Apps	Goals
2024	4	0
2025	8	0
2026	8	0
Total	20	0
