= Kiko Pomares =

Andorran footballer

Personal information
- Full name: Francisco Pomares Ortega
- Date of birth: 21 September 1998 (age 28)
- Place of birth: Sant Joan d'Alacant, Spain
- Position: Left-back

Team information
- Current team: Tarancón
- Number: 21

Youth career
- –2017: Elche

Senior career*
Years	Team	Apps	(Gls)
2016–2020	Elche B	33	(1)
2020–2021	Hércules B	15	(0)
2021–2022	Villajoyosa	16	(0)
2022–2023	Jove Español	8	(0)
2023	Viveiro	7	(0)
2023–2024	Marchamalo	16	(1)
2024–	Tarancón	53	(2)

International career^{‡}
2016	Andorra U19	3	(1)
2016–2020	Andorra U21	9	(0)
2018–	Andorra	14	(0)
- * Club domestic league appearances and goals as of 10 May 2026 ‡ National team caps and goals as of 15 November 2026

Francisco Pomares Ortega (born 21 September 1998), sportingly known as Kiko, is an Andorran international footballer who plays for CD Tarancón as a left-back.

Born in Spain, he qualifies to play for Andorra through his mother. His father is from Elche.

== International career ==
Kiko Pomares played his first international game with the national team on 21 March 2018, in a friendly against Liechtenstein.
