= Ot Remolins =

Andorran association football player

Personal information
- Full name: Ot Remolins Planes
- Date of birth: 25 February 2004 (age 22)
- Place of birth: Andorra la Vella, Andorra
- Position: Midfielder

Team information
- Current team: Oviedo B
- Number: 16

Youth career
- UE Santa Coloma
- FC Andorra
- 2018–2021: Espanyol
- 2021–2023: Rayo Alcobendas

Senior career*
Years	Team	Apps	(Gls)
2023	Rayo Alcobendas	1	(0)
2023–2024	Collado Villalba	23	(0)
2025	FC Santa Coloma	11	(1)
2025–2026	Yeclano	26	(1)
2026–	Oviedo B	2	(0)

International career^{‡}
2019	Andorra U17	3	(0)
2021–2026	Andorra U21	23	(0)
2023–	Andorra	10	(0)
- * Club domestic league appearances and goals as of 21:56, 14 September 2026 (UTC) ‡ National team caps and goals as of 16:52, 15 November 2026 (UTC)

Ot Remolins Planes (born 25 February 2004) is an Andorran footballer who plays as a midfielder for Real Oviedo Vetusta in the Spanish Segunda Federación and the Andorra national team.

== Club career ==
Born in Andorra la Vella, Remolins played youth football for UE Santa Coloma and FC Andorra, and had a trial at Club Gimnàstic de Manresa before joining the RCD Espanyol academy. After his release, he moved to Rayo Ciudad Alcobendas CF in the Preferente de Madrid, then CU Collado Villalba in the Tercera División. In February 2025, he returned to his homeland with FC Santa Coloma.

Returning to Spain, Remolins spent the 2025–26 season in the fourth-tier Segunda Federación with Yeclano Deportivo, and was not retained. On 4 June 2026, he signed for Real Oviedo Vetusta in the same division.

== International career ==
Remolins began playing for the Andorra national under-21 team in 2021, aged 17. In October 2023, he was called up for the first time to the senior team, for UEFA Euro 2024 qualifiers against Kosovo and Romania. He made his debut on 18 November in another qualifier, a 1–0 loss to Belarus in Budapest, playing the last three minutes and stoppage time as a substitute for Kiko Pomares.

== International statistics ==
As of match played 13 November 2026

Andorra
Year	Apps	Goals
2023	1	0
2024	0	0
2025	1	0
2026	8	0
Total	10	0
