= Isidre Codina =

Spanish professional football manager

Personal information
- Full name: Isidre Codina Garcia
- Place of birth: Spain

Managerial career
- Years: Team
- Sporting Escaldes
- 1996: Andorra

Isidre Codina Garcia (Note: In this Spanish name, the first or paternal surname is Codina and the second or maternal family name is Garcia.) is a Spanish professional football manager.

== Career ==
In November 1996 he coached the Andorra national football team He was a coach of Sporting Escaldes before.
