= England national under-21 football team =

National U-21 association football team

England U-21
- Nickname: The Young Lions
- Association: The Football Association (The FA)
- Confederation: UEFA (Europe)
- Head coach: Lee Carsley
- Most caps: James Milner (46)
- Top scorer: Eddie Nketiah (16)
- FIFA code: ENG
First colours	Second colours

First international
- England 0–0 Wales (Wolverhampton, England; 15 December 1976)

Biggest win
- England 9–0 San Marino (Shrewsbury, England; 19 November 2013)

Biggest defeat
- Germany 4–0 England (Malmö, Sweden; 29 June 2009)

UEFA U-21 Championship
- Appearances: 17 (first in 1978)
- Best result: Winners (4) (1982, 1984, 2023, 2025)

The England national under-21 football team, also known as England under-21s or England U21(s), is the national under-21 association football team of England, under the control of the Football Association. It is considered to be the feeder team for the England national football team.

This team is for England players aged under 21 at the start of the calendar year in which a two-year UEFA European Under-21 Championship campaign begins, so some players can remain with the squad until the age of 23. As long as they are eligible, players can play for England at any level, making it possible to play for the U21s, senior side, and again for the U21s, as Jack Butland, Harry Kane, Calum Chambers, John Stones and Emile Smith Rowe have done. It is also possible to play for one country at youth level and another at senior level (providing the player has not played a senior competitive game for his previous country).

The U21 team came into existence in 1976, following the realignment of UEFA's youth competitions. A goalless draw in a friendly against Wales at Molineux Stadium was England U21s' first result.

England U21s do not have a permanent home. They play in stadia across England, in an attempt to encourage younger fans in all areas of the country to attend matches. Because of the lower demand compared to the senior national team, smaller grounds can be used. The record attendance for an England U21 match was set on 24 March 2007, when England U21 played Italy U21 in front of a crowd of just under 60,000 at the new Wembley Stadium, also a world record attendance for a U21 game. The match was one of the required two events the stadium hosted in order to gain its safety certificate in time for its full-capacity opening for the 2007 FA Cup final in May.

== Coaching staff ==
=== Head coach ===
Tenure	Head coach/Manager
1977–1990	(England) Dave Sexton
1990–1993	(England) Lawrie McMenemy
1994–1996	(England) Dave Sexton
1996–1999	(England) Peter Taylor
1999	(England) Peter Reid
1999–2001	(England) Howard Wilkinson
2001–2004	(England) David Platt
2004–2007	(England) Peter Taylor
2007–2013	(England) Stuart Pearce
2013	(England) Roy Hodgson
2013–2016	(England) Gareth Southgate
2016–2021	(England) Aidy Boothroyd
2021–	(England) (Republic of Ireland) Lee Carsley

The original coach was Dave Sexton, who led the U21s from 1977 to 1990. In this period he combined his duties with managing the top-flight clubs Manchester United (1977–1981) and Coventry City (1981–1983). After Coventry he took a position within the FA as their first Technical Director, at Lilleshall. He handed over U21 responsibilities to England manager Graham Taylor's assistant Lawrie McMenemy for three years before resuming control from 1994 to 1996.

Peter Taylor took over in 1996 and, although never winning a tournament, his teams had an excellent record. He was controversially removed from the position in early 1999, however, and replaced initially by Peter Reid, who resigned after just one match in charge to dedicate more time to his other job as manager of Sunderland. Howard Wilkinson took over afterwards, yet could only produce four wins in ten competitive matches and quit after a year and a half in charge. David Platt took charge leaving his job at Nottingham Forest. Platt was U21 boss from 2001 to 2004, but had little success before Taylor's return. Taylor left in January 2007, as the senior national manager Steve McClaren wanted the U21s to have a full-time manager. Taylor, at the time, was combining his duties with his role as Crystal Palace boss.

On 1 February 2007, Manchester City manager Stuart Pearce was appointed as head coach on a part-time basis until after the European Championships in the summer of 2007. Nigel Pearson, Newcastle United's assistant manager, agreed to become Pearce's assistant. Their first match in charge was a 2–2 draw against Spain on 6 February 2007 at Derby County's Pride Park Stadium. For the match against Italy, Nigel Pearson took charge as Stuart Pearce had club commitments. Steve Wigley assisted Pearson.

Pearce was dismissed as Manchester City manager on 14 May 2007, before the 2007 European Championships, but on 19 July 2007 he was named full-time U21s coach. He remained in the post until June 2013, when it was announced that his contract would not be renewed. On 31 July, the FA announced that England senior manager Roy Hodgson would take charge of an England U21 friendly match against Scotland at Bramall Lane, the match ended in a 6–0 win for Hodgson's side. Former England international Gareth Southgate was made manager of the under-21 team on 22 August.

In September 2016, Southgate was appointed to the temporary position of caretaker manager of the England senior side after the departure of Sam Allardyce. With Southgate overseeing the main team for four games, Aidy Boothroyd, the England under-20 manager, was appointed caretaker manager of the under-21s until Southgate's return. In February 2017, Boothroyd was confirmed as the permanent manager. Boothroyd left the role on in April 2021 following a disappointing European Championship campaign.

On 27 July 2021, Lee Carsley was promoted from his role with the England U20s to become the head coach of the U21s with Ashley Cole appointed as his assistant. His contract as head coach of the U21s England National team will end after the 2027 Euros.

=== U21 coaching staff ===
Position	Staff
Manager	(England) Lee Carsley
Assistant coaches	(England) Paul Williams (England) Conor Coady (England) Tim Dittmer

== Media coverage ==
England Euro qualifiers and friendlies are currently broadcast by The FA Player. The 2025 UEFA European Under-21 Championship was shown by Channel 4.

== Results and fixtures ==
Win Draw Loss

=== 2025 ===
14 November 2027 UEFA U-21 Group D Qualifier	England	2–0	Republic of Ireland	Birmingham, England
19:45	Mubama 60' (pen.); George 90+1'	Report	Devaney (yellow card) 15'; Jauny (yellow card) 59'	Stadium: St Andrew's; Attendance: 9,961; Referee: Iuliana Demetrescu (Romania)

18 November 2027 UEFA U-21 Group D Qualifier	Slovakia	0–4	England	Prešov, Slovakia
17:00	Fiala (yellow card) 70'	Report	Mubama 18', 87'; Peck (yellow card) 45'; Lewis (yellow card) 55'; Nwaneri 60'; King 73'	Stadium: Futbal Tatran Arena; Attendance: 5,903; Referee: Kamal Umudlu (Azerbaijan)

=== 2026 ===
27 March 2027 UEFA U-21 Group D Qualifier	Andorra	1–1	England	Andorra la Vella, Andorra
18:30 GMT	Solà 52'; Domínguez (yellow card) 86'; Remolins (yellow card) 90+1'	Report	Lewis 90' (pen.)	Stadium: Estadi Nacional, Andorra la Vella; Attendance: 1,007; Referee: Klym Zabroda (Ukraine)

31 March 2027 UEFA U-21 Group D Qualifier	England	4–1	Moldova	Norwich, England
19:00 BST	Nwaneri 11', 73'; Lewis-Skelly (yellow card) 57'; Gray 61'; Esse (yellow card) 62' (goal) 82'	Report	Luchița 48'; Graminschii (yellow card) 63'; Ciumașu (yellow card) 84'	Stadium: Carrow Road; Attendance: 11,547; Referee: Patryk Gryckiewicz (Poland)

25 September 2027 UEFA U-21 Group D Qualifier	England	4–2	Kazakhstan	Wolverhampton, England
19:30 BST	Turganov 27' (o.g.); Acheampong 32'; Alleyne 60'; Lankshear 90+1'	Report	Litosh 3'; Popov 43'	Stadium: Molineux Stadium; Attendance: 5,341; Referee: Mateo Tozan (Slovenia)

2 October 2027 UEFA U-21 Group D Qualifier	England	0–0	Slovakia	Stoke-on-Trent, England
19:45 BST		Report		Stadium: bet365 Stadium; Attendance: 8,313; Referee: Mateo Busquets Ferrer (Spain)

6 October 2027 UEFA U-21 Group D Qualifier	Republic of Ireland	3–1	England	Cork, Republic of Ireland
18:00 BST	Lonergan 22', 63'; McManus 38'	Report	Dibling 8'	Stadium: Turners Cross; Attendance: 5,427; Referee: Alessandro Dudic (Switzerland)

13 November International friendly	England	–	Portugal	Bristol, England
19:30				Stadium: Ashton Gate

16 November International friendly	England	–	France	Bristol, England
19:30				Stadium: Ashton Gate

=== 2027 UEFA European Under-21 Championship qualification ===
Pos	Team	Pld	W	D	L	GF	GA	GD	Pts	Qualification	England	Ireland	Slovakia	Moldova	Andorra	Kazakhstan
1	England	10	7	2	1	23	7	+16	23	Final tournament	—	2–0	0–0	4–1	1–0	4–2
2	Republic of Ireland	10	6	2	2	16	14	+2	20 (Note: Head-to-head points: Republic of Ireland 4, Slovakia 1.)	Play-offs	3–1	—	2–2	1–1	1–0	4–3
3	Slovakia	10	6	2	2	17	13	+4	20		0–4	0–2	—	2–0	3–0	2–1
4	Moldova	10	2	3	5	12	19	−7	9		0–4	1–2	2–3	—	3–0	3–2
5	Andorra	10	2	2	6	7	12	−5	8		1–1	4–0	1–2	0–0	—	1–0
6	Kazakhstan	10	1	1	8	11	21	−10	4		0–2	0–1	1–3	1–1	1–0	—

Source: UEFA
Legend: Blue = home team win; Yellow = draw; Red = away team win.
Rules for classification: Tiebreakers

== Players ==
=== Current squad ===
Players born on or after 1 January 2004 are eligible for the 2027 UEFA European Under-21 Championship.

The following players were named in the squad for games against Portugal and France, played 13 and 16 November 2026.

Caps and goals updated as of 6 October 2026, after the match against Republic of Ireland. Names in bold denote players who have been capped for the senior team.

No.	Pos.	Player	Date of birth (age)	Caps	Goals	Club
	GK	James Beadle	16 July 2004 (age 22)	18	0	(The Football Association) Birmingham City (on loan from Brighton & Hove Albion)
	GK	Tommy Setford	13 March 2006 (age 20)	4	0	(The Football Association) Stevenage (on loan from Arsenal)
	GK	Tommy Simkin	8 December 2004 (age 21)	0	0	(The Football Association) Doncaster Rovers (on loan from Stoke City)
	GK	Matty Young	24 November 2006 (age 19)	0	0	(The Football Association) Huddersfield Town (on loan from Sunderland)
	DF	**Rico Lewis**	21 November 2004 (age 21)	15	2	(The Football Association) Manchester City
	DF	Brooke Norton-Cuffy	12 January 2004 (age 22)	14	0	(The Football Association) Hull City
	DF	Josh Acheampong	5 May 2006 (age 20)	8	1	(The Football Association) Chelsea
	DF	Max Alleyne	21 July 2005 (age 21)	8	1	(The Football Association) Burnley (on loan from Manchester City)
	DF	Ashley Phillips	26 June 2005 (age 21)	6	0	(The Football Association) Middlesbrough
	DF	Stephen Mfuni	12 February 2008 (age 18)	2	0	(The Football Association) Coventry City (on loan from Manchester City)
	DF	Jahmai Simpson-Pusey	4 November 2005 (age 21)	1	0	(German Football Association) 1. FC Köln
	MF	Archie Gray	12 March 2006 (age 20)	20	2	(The Football Association) Tottenham Hotspur
	MF	Jack Hinshelwood	11 April 2005 (age 21)	11	0	(The Football Association) Brighton & Hove Albion
	MF	Sydie Peck	13 September 2004 (age 22)	10	0	(The Football Association) Sheffield United
	MF	Harrison Armstrong	19 January 2007 (age 19)	1	0	(The Football Association) Everton
	MF	Divine Mukasa	22 August 2007 (age 19)	1	0	(The Football Association) West Ham United (on loan from Manchester City)
	MF	Trey Nyoni	30 June 2007 (age 19)	0	0	(The Football Association) Liverpool
	FW	Ethan Nwaneri	21 March 2007 (age 19)	18	5	(German Football Association) Borussia Dortmund (on loan from Arsenal)
	FW	Divin Mubama	25 October 2004 (age 22)	10	5	(The Football Association) Southampton (on loan from Manchester City)
	FW	Tyrique George	4 February 2006 (age 20)	9	2	(The Football Association) Everton
	FW	Amario Cozier-Duberry	29 May 2005 (age 21)	2	0	(The Football Association) Middlesbrough (on loan from Brighton & Hove Albion)
	FW	Max Dowman	31 December 2009 (age 16)	0	0	(The Football Association) Arsenal
	FW	Jovon Makama	1 February 2004 (age 22)	0	0	(The Football Association) Norwich City
	FW	Mikey Moore	11 August 2007 (age 19)	0	0	(German Football Association) 1. FC Köln (on loan from Tottenham Hotspur)

=== Recent call-ups ===
The following players have previously been called up to the England under-21 squad and remain eligible for selection.

Pos.	Player	Date of birth (age)	Caps	Goals	Club	Latest call-up
GK	Finlay Herrick	18 January 2006 (age 20)	0	0	(England) West Ham United	v. Republic of Ireland, Slovakia, 14–18 November 2025
GK	Elyh Harrison	19 February 2006 (age 20)	0	0	(Scotland) Greenock Morton (on loan from Manchester United)	v. Republic of Ireland, Slovakia, 14–18 November 2025 ^{INJ}
DF	Kellen Fisher	5 May 2004 (age 22)	2	0	(England) Norwich City	v. Kazakhstan, Slovakia, Republic of Ireland, September–October 2026 ^{INJ}
DF	Ben Chrisene	12 January 2004 (age 22)	1	0	(England) Norwich City	v. Kazakhstan, Slovakia, Republic of Ireland, September–October 2026 ^{INJ}
DF	Matty Henderson-Hall	8 December 2006 (age 19)	0	0	(England) Manchester City	v. Kazakhstan, Slovakia, Republic of Ireland, September–October 2026
DF	Thierry Small	1 August 2004 (age 22)	2	0	(England) Preston North End	v. Andorra, Moldova, 27–31 March 2026
DF	Ben Nelson	18 March 2004 (age 22)	0	0	(England) Leicester City	v. Andorra, Moldova, 27–31 March 2026
DF	**Lewis Hall**	8 September 2004 (age 22)	7	0	(England) Newcastle United	v. Republic of Ireland, Slovakia, 14–18 November 2025
DF	**Nico O'Reilly**	21 March 2005 (age 21)	0	0	(England) Manchester City	v. Moldova, Andorra, 10-13 October 2025 ^{SEN}
MF	Jobe Bellingham	23 September 2005 (age 21)	12	1	(Germany) Borussia Dortmund	v. Kazakhstan, Slovakia, Republic of Ireland, September–October 2026 ^{INJ}
MF	Josh King	3 January 2007 (age 19)	9	1	(England) Fulham	v. Kazakhstan, Slovakia, Republic of Ireland, September–October 2026
MF	Lewis Miley	1 May 2006 (age 20)	5	0	(England) Newcastle United	v. Kazakhstan, Slovakia, Republic of Ireland, September–October 2026 ^{INJ}
MF	**Myles Lewis-Skelly**	26 September 2006 (age 20)	2	0	(England) Arsenal	v. Andorra, Moldova, 27–31 March 2026
MF	**Adam Wharton**	6 February 2004 (age 22)	3	0	(England) Crystal Palace	Training Camp, June 2025 ^{INJ}
MF	George Earthy	5 September 2004 (age 22)	2	0	(England) Reading	v. Spain, Netherlands, 15–18 November 2024
MF	Darko Gyabi	18 February 2004 (age 22)	2	0	(England) Hull City	v. Spain, Netherlands, 15–18 November 2024
MF	**Kobbie Mainoo**	19 April 2005 (age 21)	0	0	(England) Manchester United	v. Azerbaijan, Luxembourg, 22–26 March 2024 ^{SEN}
FW	Jamie Gittens	8 August 2004 (age 22)	17	2	(England) Chelsea	v. Kazakhstan, Slovakia, Republic of Ireland, September–October 2026 ^{INJ}
FW	Tyler Dibling	17 February 2006 (age 20)	11	1	(England) Everton	v. Kazakhstan, Slovakia, Republic of Ireland, September–October 2026
FW	Sam Amo-Ameyaw	18 July 2006 (age 20)	5	0	(France) Strasbourg	v. Kazakhstan, Slovakia, Republic of Ireland, September–October 2026
FW	Will Lankshear	20 April 2005 (age 21)	3	1	(England) Middlesbrough	v. Kazakhstan, Slovakia, Republic of Ireland, September–October 2026
FW	Romain Esse	13 May 2005 (age 21)	3	1	(England) Millwall (on loan from Crystal Palace)	v. Andorra, Moldova, 27–31 March 2026
FW	Tommy Watson	8 April 2006 (age 20)	2	0	(England) Leicester City (on loan from Brighton & Hove Albion)	v. Moldova, Andorra, 10–13 October 2025
FW	Dane Scarlett	24 March 2004 (age 22)	4	2	(England) Leyton Orient	Training Camp, June 2025 ^{INJ}

- ^{INJ} Player withdrew from the squad before any games had been played.
- ^{SEN} Player withdrew from the squad due to a call up to the senior team.

=== Past squads ===
- 2000 UEFA European Under-21 Football Championship squad
- 2002 UEFA European Under-21 Football Championship squad
- 2007 UEFA European Under-21 Football Championship squad
- 2009 UEFA European Under-21 Football Championship squad
- 2011 UEFA European Under-21 Football Championship squad
- 2013 UEFA European Under-21 Football Championship squad
- 2015 UEFA European Under-21 Football Championship squad
- 2017 UEFA European Under-21 Football Championship squad
- 2019 UEFA European Under-21 Football Championship squad
- 2021 UEFA European Under-21 Football Championship squad
- 2023 UEFA European Under-21 Football Championship squad
- 2025 UEFA European Under-21 Football Championship squad

== Records ==
=== Most appearances ===
Rank	Player	Caps	Goals	Career	Clubs
1	James Milner	46	9	2004–2009	Leeds United, Newcastle United, Aston Villa
2	Nathaniel Chalobah	40	1	2012–2017	Chelsea
3	Nathan Redmond	38	10	2013–2017	Birmingham City, Norwich City, Southampton
4	Tom Huddlestone	33	5	2005–2009	Derby County, Tottenham Hotspur
4	Fabrice Muamba	33	0	2007–2011	Birmingham City, Bolton Wanderers
6	James Ward-Prowse	31	6	2013–2017	Southampton
7	Michael Mancienne	30	1	2007–2011	Chelsea, Hamburger SV
8	Scott Carson	29	0	2004–2007	Leeds United, Liverpool
8	Danny Rose	29	3	2009–2013	Tottenham Hotspur
8	Steven Taylor	29	4	2004–2009	Newcastle United

Note: Club(s) represents the permanent clubs during the player's time in the Under-21s. Those players in bold are still eligible to play for the team.

=== Leading Goalscorers ===
Rank	Player	Goals	Caps	Ratio	Career	Club(s)
1	Eddie Nketiah	16	17	0.94	2018–2021	Arsenal
2	Harvey Elliott	14	28	0.5	2022–2025	Liverpool
3	Alan Shearer	13	11	1.18	1990–1992	Southampton, Newcastle United
3	Francis Jeffers	13	16	0.81	1999–2003	Everton, Arsenal
5	Saido Berahino	11	12	0.92	2013–2015	West Bromwich Albion
6	Nathan Redmond	10	38	0.26	2013–2017	Birmingham City, Norwich City, Southampton
7	Darren Bent	9	14	0.64	2003–2005	Ipswich Town, Charlton Athletic
7	Dominic Solanke	9	18	0.5	2015–2019	Chelsea, Liverpool, Bournemouth
7	Frank Lampard	9	19	0.47	1997–2000	West Ham United
7	Tammy Abraham	9	26	0.35	2016–2019	Chelsea
7	James Milner	9	46	0.2	2004–2009	Leeds United, Newcastle United, Aston Villa

Note: Club(s) represents the permanent clubs during the player's time in the Under-21s. Those players in bold are still eligible to play for the team.

== Competitive record ==
As a European U21 team, England compete for the European Championship, with the finals every odd-numbered year, formerly even-numbered years. There is no Under-21 World Cup, although there is an U20 World Cup. For the first six (1978–1988) European Under-21 Football Championships, England did well, getting knocked out in the semi-finals on four occasions and winning the competition in 1982 and 1984. Then, as one might expect with a rapid turnover of players, followed a lean period.

After losing to France in the 1988 semi-final, England then failed to qualify for the last eight for five whole campaigns. In the qualifying stages for the 1998 tournament, England won their group, but fate was not on their side. Because there were nine groups, and only eight places, the two group-winning nations with worst records had to a play-off to eliminate one of them. England lost the away leg of this extra qualifying round and were eliminated on away goals to Greece. In effect, England finished ninth in the competition despite losing only one of their ten matches.

England qualified for the 2000 finals comfortably. Under the 1996-appointed Peter Taylor England won every match without conceding a goal. But with 3 matches to play, Taylor was replaced in a controversial manner by Howard Wilkinson, who won the next two matches. The three goals conceded in the 3–1 defeat to group runners-up Poland were the only blemish on the team's qualifying record. England got knocked out in the group stage of the European Championship finals in 2000 under Wilkinson.

After enlisting former international star David Platt as manager, England qualified for the 2002 tournament in Switzerland. Again England did poorly in the group stage. Platt's England failed to qualify for the 2004 tournament and he was replaced by the returning Peter Taylor. Taylor's England qualified from the group but lost to a strong France team in a two-legged playoff and failed to qualify for the 2006 tournament.

The next campaign started shortly after the 2006 finals – the qualification stage of the 2007 competition. UEFA decided to shift the tournament forward to avoid a clash with senior tournaments taking place in even-numbered years. The qualification stage was heavily reduced, being completed in a year's less time. In a 3-team qualification group, England qualified over Switzerland and Moldova, and then won a two-legged play-off with Germany to qualify for the finals held in the Netherlands. At the tournament, England progressed through to the semi-finals where they led for the majority of the match against the hosts. However, after a late equaliser and a marathon penalty shootout, England were eliminated.

In 2009, England finished as runners-up, losing 4–0 to Germany in the final.

England finished second in their qualifying group for the 2011 championships in Denmark. They subsequently defeated Romania in the play-offs to qualify for the finals tournament, where they were knocked out in the group stage after a 2–1 defeat to the Czech Republic. England also subsequently exited the 2013 and 2015 Finals tournaments at the group stage, reached the semi–final in 2017, before again exiting at the group stage in 2019 and 2021.

England won the tournament for the third time in 2023, winning all their games without conceding a single goal. They retained the title in 2025.

UEFA European Under-21 Championship record									UEFA European Under-21 Championship qualification record						Manager(s)
Year	Round	Position	Pld	W	D *	L	GF	GA	Pld	W	D	L	GF	GA	Manager(s)
(Europe) 1978	Semi-Finals	4th of 8	4	1	2	1	4	4	4	4	0	0	17	2	Sexton
(Europe) 1980	Semi-Finals	3rd of 8	4	1	1	2	4	4	4	4	0	0	11	2	Sexton
(Europe) 1982	Champions	1st of 8	6	3	2	1	11	8	6	4	1	1	12	5	Sexton
(Europe) 1984	Champions	1st of 8	6	5	0	1	13	3	6	5	0	1	13	4	Sexton
(Europe) 1986	Semi-Finals	4th of 8	4	1	2	1	3	4	6	3	2	1	9	3	Sexton
(Europe) 1988	Semi-Finals	3rd of 8	4	2	1	1	6	6	4	1	3	0	7	3	Sexton
(Europe) 1990	did not qualify								6	4	1	1	10	5	Sexton
(Europe) 1992	did not qualify								6	3	1	2	11	5	McMenemy
(France) 1994	did not qualify								10	4	3	3	20	8	McMenemy
(Spain) 1996	did not qualify								8	6	1	1	13	4	Sexton
(Romania) 1998	did not qualify								10	6	3	1	11	5	Taylor
(Slovakia) 2000	Group stage	5th of 8	3	1	0	2	6	4	9	8	0	1	26	3	Taylor, Reid, Wilkinson
(Switzerland) 2002	Group stage	7th of 8	3	1	0	2	4	6	8	5	2	1	18	8	Wilkinson Platt
(Germany) 2004	did not qualify								8	3	2	3	14	10	Platt
(Portugal) 2006	did not qualify								12	6	4	2	23	10	Taylor
(Netherlands) 2007	Semi-Finals	3rd of 8	4	1	3	0	5	3	4	3	1	0	8	4	Taylor, Pearce
(Sweden) 2009	Runners-Up	2nd of 8	5	2	2	1	8	9	10	8	2	0	22	5	Pearce
(Denmark) 2011	Group stage	7th of 8	3	0	2	1	2	3	10	6	3	1	17	8	Pearce
(Israel) 2013	Group stage	7th of 8	3	0	0	3	1	5	10	9	0	1	26	3	Pearce
(Czech Republic) 2015	Group stage	7th of 8	3	1	0	2	2	4	12	11	1	0	35	4	Southgate
(Poland) 2017	Semi-Finals	3rd of 12	4	2	2	0	7	3	8	6	2	0	20	3	Southgate, Boothroyd
(Italy) 2019	Group stage	9th of 12	3	0	1	2	6	9	10	8	2	0	23	4	Boothroyd
(Slovenia) (Hungary) 2021	Group stage	12th of 16	3	1	0	2	2	4	10	9	1	0	34	9	Boothroyd
(Romania) (Georgia (country)) 2023	Champions	1st of 16	6	6	0	0	11	0	10	8	1	1	26	7	Carsley
(Slovakia) 2025	Champions	1st of 16	6	4	1	1	12	7	10	8	1	1	41	6	Carsley
(Albania) (Serbia) 2027															Carsley
Total	4 titles	18/25	68	28	18	22	95	79	201	142	37	22	467	130	

Note: The year of the tournament represents the year in which it ends.

*Draws include knockout matches decided on penalty kicks.
