= Andorra national football team =

Men's association football team

Andorra
- Nickname(s): Tricolors (The Tricolours); Bisbes (The Bishops)
- Association: Federació Andorrana de Futbol (FAF)
- Confederation: UEFA (Europe)
- Head coach: Koldo Álvarez
- Captain: Moisés San Nicolás
- Most caps: Ildefons Lima (137)
- Top scorer: Ildefons Lima (11)
- Home stadium: Estadi de la FAF, Encamp
- FIFA code: AND
First colours	Second colours

FIFA ranking
- Current: 173 ▲2 (18 November 2026)
- Highest: 125 (September 2005)
- Lowest: 206 (December 2011)

First international
- Andorra 1–6 Estonia (Andorra la Vella, Andorra; 13 November 1996)

Biggest win
- San Marino 0–3 Andorra (Serravalle, San Marino; 12 October 2021)

Biggest defeat
- Czech Republic 8–1 Andorra (Liberec, Czech Republic; 4 June 2005); Croatia 7–0 Andorra (Zagreb, Croatia; 7 October 2006); Portugal 7–0 Andorra (Lisbon, Portugal; 11 November 2020)

The Andorra national football team (Catalan: Selecció de futbol d'Andorra) represents Andorra in men's international football and is controlled by the Andorran Football Federation, the governing body for football in Andorra. The team has enjoyed very little success due to the Principality's tiny population, the fifth smallest of any UEFA country (only Liechtenstein, San Marino, Gibraltar and the Faroe Islands are smaller).

Andorra's first official game was a 6–1 defeat in a friendly match to Estonia in 1996. Since the qualifying rounds for the UEFA Euro 2000 tournament, Andorra have competed in qualifying for every European Championship and FIFA World Cup but have had very little success. They have only won fifteen matches since becoming recognised by FIFA in 1996.

== History ==
Though the Andorran Football Federation formed in 1994, and the domestic league started in 1995, the national team did not participate in major championships until its affiliation with governing bodies FIFA and UEFA in 1996. Since the European qualifiers for the 1998 World Cup were already underway, Andorra could join them by the time FAF joined football's European and global governing bodies.
While Andorra played its first match against Estonia in Andorra La Vella and lost 6–1.. Andorra's first match in a FIFA-sanctioned competition was a 3–1 loss to Armenia on 5 September 1998 in a qualifier for UEFA Euro 2000. Andorra lost all ten qualifiers.
The team particularly struggled in away matches; each loss was by at least three goals. Andorra scored only three goals, two of which were penalties, and two of which were in the away matches. Andorra conceded 28 goals, and their biggest defeat of the qualifiers was a 6–1 away loss to Russia.

In the 2002 World Cup qualifiers, Andorra's first world cup qualification round, they were drawn in a group with Cyprus, Estonia, Ireland, the Netherlands and Portugal. They lost their opening match 1–0 to Estonia. In the next game, they lost 3–2 to Cyprus but scored their first World Cup qualifying goals. They were again defeated by Estonia, this time 2–1. They lost all their matches and their only away goal was in a 3–1 loss against Ireland. Their worst defeat was 7–1 to Portugal on a neutral ground in Lleida, Spain. Andorra finished the campaign with no points and conceded 36 goals in ten matches.

In the team's qualification campaign for UEFA Euro 2004 they again lost every game. They scored their only goal in a 2–1 away loss to Bulgaria. In this competition the scores were closer than before as they lost 3–0 to Bulgaria, Croatia and Belgium, 2–0 twice to Estonia, 2–0 to Croatia and 1–0 to Belgium.

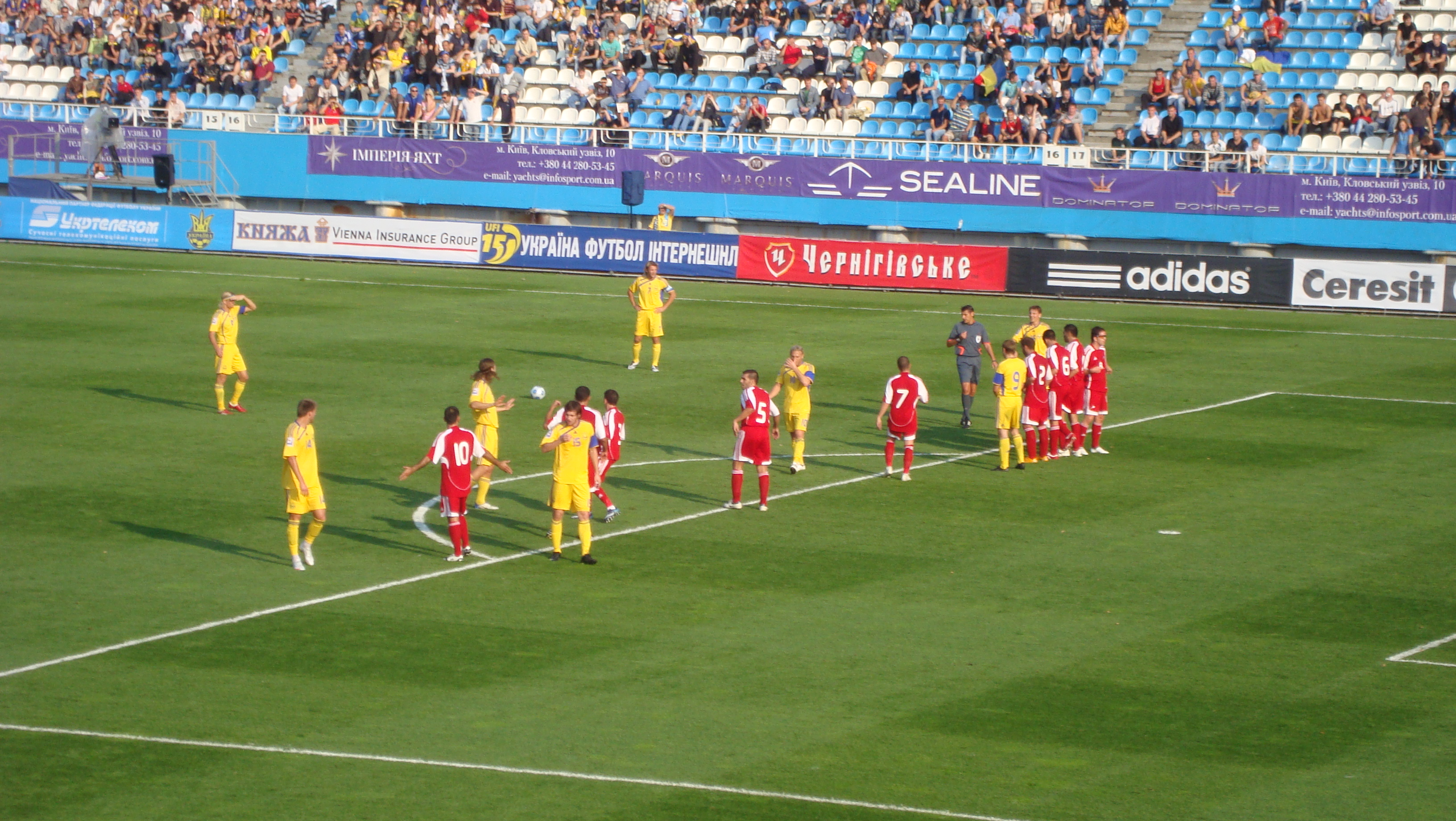
Match against Ukraine in 2009.

By Andorran standards, qualification for the 2006 FIFA World Cup was successful. They won their first competitive game 1–0 at home against Macedonia. Andorra midfielder Marc Bernaus, who played in the Spanish second division, received a long throw in off his chest and volleyed in a goal early in the second half. After the game, Macedonia coach Dragan Kanatlarovski resigned and called the game "a shameful outcome, a humiliation." Andorra also drew two matches, 0–0 in Macedonia and 0–0 at home against Finland.

In the UEFA Euro 2008 qualifying, Andorra again lost every game. The closest game was against Russia, a 1–0 defeat on 21 November 2007. Their biggest defeat was a 7–0 loss to Croatia in Andorra La Vella, which is their worst defeat in UEFA competitions and matched their loss to the Czech Republic as their largest losing deficit. Andorra scored only two goals and conceded 42 in a total of 12 games. In 2010 World Cup qualifying, Andorra lost all ten matches. For the tournament, they scored three goals, in defeats to Belarus and Kazakhstan, and conceded 39 goals, including six in a defeat to England, the largest margin in the group.

Qualifying for UEFA Euro 2012 ended in familiar fashion; they lost all ten matches, scoring only one goal and conceding 25; their best results were two one-goal losses to Slovakia and a 3–1 loss in Ireland. The 2014 FIFA World Cup qualifying tournament was even more disastrous. Andorra lost all their matches while conceding 30 goals and not scoring.

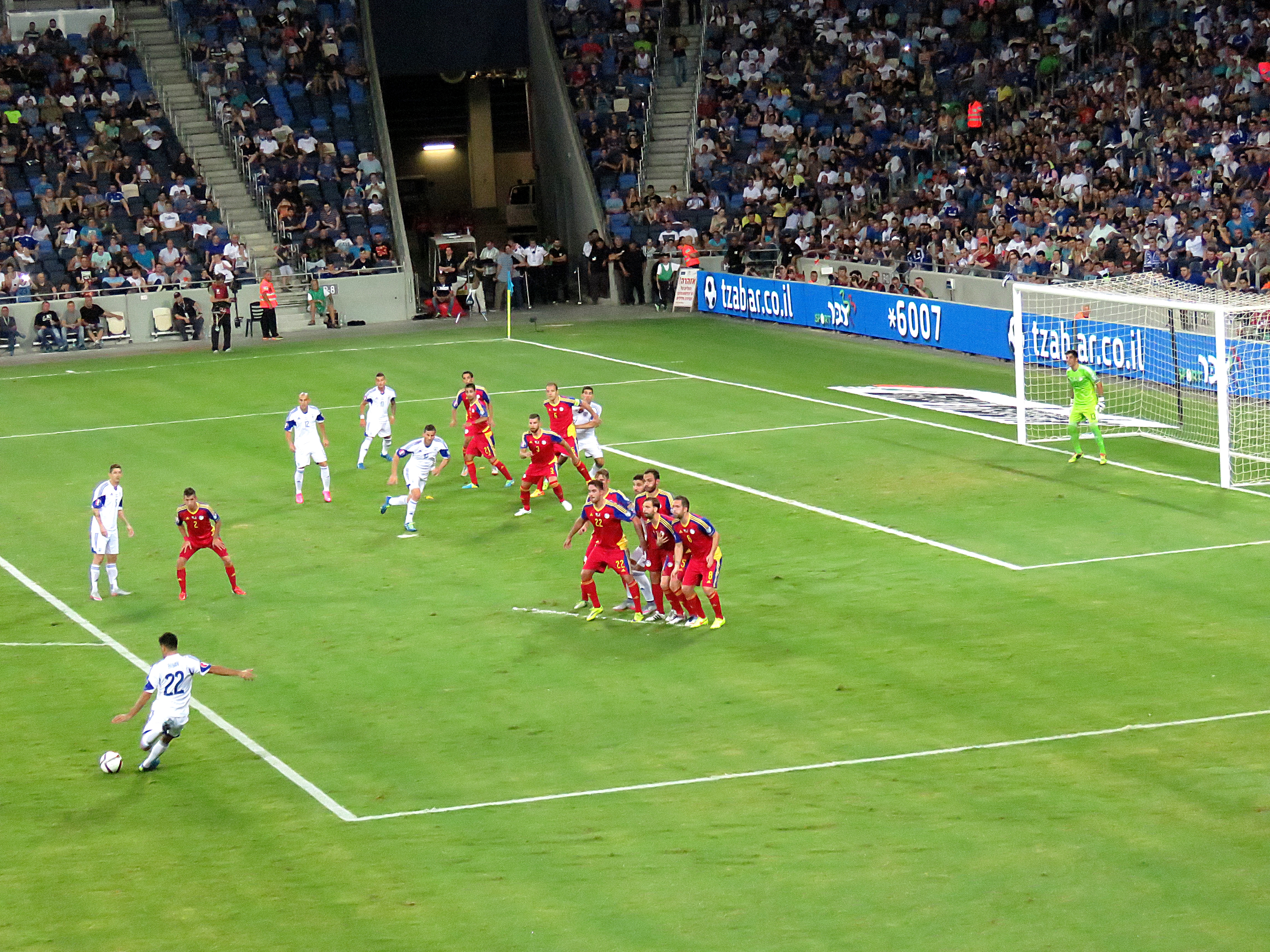
Against Israel in 2015.

During 2016 UEFA Euro qualifying, Andorra again lost all of its ten games but scored four goals, setting a national team record for goals scored in a European Championship qualifying group. On 22 February 2017, Andorra beat San Marino away 2–0 in a friendly match, ending with 12 years and 132 days without winning any match. On 9 June 2017, Andorra beat Hungary 1–0 in a World Cup home qualifier with a goal by Marc Rebés, their first victory in a competitive match since 2004. Thanks to these two wins and a draw against the Faroe Islands on 6 July 2017, Andorra progressed 57 positions in the FIFA rankings to 129th, its second best position ever. On 21 March 2018, Rebés scored the only goal of a friendly win over Liechtenstein in Spain, giving Andorra their third victory of the last 13 months and sixth of all time.

In 2018, Andorra made its debut in the newly created UEFA Nations League. They played in Group 1 of League D, where they finished at the bottom of the group with four ties and two losses, finishing unbeaten at home.

On 11 October 2019, Andorra won 1–0 against Moldova in the UEFA Euro 2020 qualifying competition, thus ending a 56-match winless run in Euro qualifiers. One month later, the team earned one more point after an away draw against Albania, thus avoiding for the first time to end a qualifying round in the last position.

On 7 December 2020, after the draw for the 2022 FIFA World Cup qualifiers, Andorra was given an opportunity to achieve further success in official competition as it was placed in Group I where it found among its five opponents San Marino, the lowest placed team in the last pot and which it has faced before that only once in a friendly match (away on 22 February 2017, for a 2–0 victory). Their other opponents were Albania (against whom they drew 2–2 away in UEFA Euro 2020 qualifying), Hungary (whom they beat at home 1–0 in the 2018 World Cup qualifiers), Poland and England. On 2 September 2021 Andorra achieved a 3rd success in the qualifiers of a World Cup, at home against San Marino (2–0). On 12 October 2021 Andorra achieved a 4th success in a World Cup qualifier, beating San Marino again in the return match (3–0). It was also a first in several respects: it is the largest Andorran victory in its history, but also the first time that the Pyrenean selection managed to score 3 goals in the same game and won an away match; finally it also succeeded for the first time in its history to sign 2 successes in the same qualifying phase and pocket 6 points. However, they lost all their games against their four other opponents and finished second to last in the group with 6 points, with a record of 2 wins and 8 losses.

On 25 March 2022 Andorra defeated St. Kitts and Nevis at home (1–0), recording its first win against a non-European team. Three days later, Andorra defeated another non-European side with another 1–0 win at home to Grenada. On 10 June 2022, in the 2022–23 edition of the UEFA Nations League, Andorra won at home against Liechtenstein (2–1), with Jesús Rubio scoring a spectacular goal with a 60-meter lob on the second Andorran goal, thus signing its first success in this competition for its third participation. This success also means that the Pyrenean team has achieved at least one victory in each of the official competitions in which it has taken part. On September 22, they beat Liechtenstein, 2–0, in Vaduz - this was their first away win in the Nations League. The Pyrenees team totaled 8 points at the end of this edition thanks to two home draws against Moldova (0–0) and Latvia (1–1), finishing undefeated at home and losing only two away games against the Latvians and Moldovans, which is its best record in the group stage of any competition.

== Stadium ==
From 1996 to 2014, Andorra played their home matches at the Comunal d'Andorra la Vella, in the capital city of Andorra la Vella. This stadium has a capacity of 1,800 and also hosts the matches of club sides FC Andorra and the Andorran Premier League. On 9 September 2014, the national team played at the Estadi Nacional with a capacity of 3,306.

A new home stadium, Nou Estadi Encamp was inaugurated the 14th of October, 2025.

Andorra have occasionally played home matches outside their borders. For example, Andorra hosted France and England in the 2000 European Championship, 2008 European Championship and 2010 World Cup qualifiers in the Estadi Olímpic Lluís Companys in Barcelona, which was the home of RCD Espanyol between 1997 and 2009. Andorra hosted England in the 2026 World Cup Qualifiers in the RCDE Stadium in Barcelona, which is the current home of RCD Espanyol.

== Ranking ==
Andorra's lopsided win–loss record gives them a lowly ranking in world football. The nation has only won seven competitive fixtures, four World Cup qualifying matches against Macedonia in October 2004 and Hungary in June 2017, both by 1–0; San Marino in September and October 2021 by 2–0 at home and 3–0 away at Serravalle (their biggest ever win), a single European Championship qualifying match at home against Moldova in October 2019 by 1–0 and two UEFA Nations League matches against Liechtenstein in June and September 2022 by 2–1 at home and 2–0 away at Vaduz; and six friendly games, three of them by 2–0 against Belarus in April 2000 and Albania in April 2002 at home and San Marino in February 2017 away, as well as three wins by 1–0 margin against Liechtenstein at neutral venues in March 2018 and against St. Kitts and Nevis and Grenada at home in March 2022.

With the fourth smallest population of any UEFA country, until the admission of Gibraltar, the talent pool is small. Players are predominantly amateurs because the Andorra domestic league is only part-time. Since Andorra began playing in 1996, their average FIFA ranking is 163.

== Kit suppliers ==
Kit provider	Period
(Germany) Reusch	1996–2000
(United States) Reebok	1998–2004
(Italy) Diadora	2004–2006
(Spain) Joma	2006–2008
(Germany) Adidas	2008–2018
(Italy) Macron	2018–2022
(Italy) Errea	2022–2026
(Germany) Adidas	2026–

== Results and fixtures ==
The following is a list of match results in the last 12 months, as well as any future matches that have been scheduled.

Win Draw Loss Fixture

=== 2026 ===
27 March 2026 Friendly	Montenegro	2–0	Andorra	Podgorica, Montenegro
18:00 UTC+1	Mugoša 41' (pen.); Osmajić 80'	Report		Stadium: Podgorica City Stadium; Attendance: 1,855; Referee: Enea Jorgji (Albania)

31 March 2026 Friendly	San Marino	0–0	Andorra	Serravalle, San Marino
18:00 UTC+2		Report		Stadium: San Marino Stadium; Attendance: 361; Referee: Kyriakos Athanasiou (Cyprus)

29 May 2026 Friendly	Andorra	0–1	Iraq	Girona, Spain
18:00 UTC+2		Report	Yousif 20'	Stadium: Estadi Montilivi; Referee: Ricardo De Burgos Bengoetxea (Spain)

4 June 2026 Friendly	Andorra	2–0	Liechtenstein	Encamp, Andorra
19:00 UTC+2	Martínez 74'; Aláez 81' (pen.)	Report		Stadium: Estadi de la FAF; Attendance: 1,000; Referee: Javier Alberola Rojas (Spain)

7 June 2026 Friendly	Kosovo	3–0	Andorra	Pristina, Kosovo
20:00 UTC+2	Álvarez 41' (o.g.); Al.Rrahmani 53' (pen.); Matoshi 78'	Report		Stadium: Fadil Vokrri Stadium; Attendance: 5,000; Referee: Juxhin Xhaja (Albania)

24 September 2026 2026–27 UEFA Nations League	Andorra	1–2	Malta	Encamp, Andorra
20:45 UTC+2	G.López 17'	Report	Cardona 36'; Teuma 81'	Stadium: Estadi de la FAF; Attendance: 905; Referee: Joey Kooij (Netherlands)

27 September 2026 2026–27 UEFA Nations League	Gibraltar	0–0	Andorra	Europa Point, Gibraltar
18:00 UTC+2		Report		Stadium: Europa Sports Park; Attendance: 1,382; Referee: Genc Nuza (Kosovo)

30 September 2026 Friendly	Lithuania	3–0	Andorra	Kaunas, Lithuania
19:00 UTC+3	Ruzgis 21' (pen.); Steponavičius 27'; Kučys 46'	Report		Stadium: Darius and Girėnas Stadium; Referee: Andris Treimanis (Latvia)

4 October 2026 2026–27 UEFA Nations League	Malta	1–0	Andorra	Ta' Qali, Malta
18:00 UTC+2	Teuma 49'	Report		Stadium: National Stadium; Attendance: 5,894; Referee: Mikkel Redder (Denmark)

13 November 2026 2026–27 UEFA Nations League	Andorra	2–0	Gibraltar	Encamp, Andorra
20:45 UTC+1	López 24'; Rosas 35'	Report		Stadium: Estadi de la FAF; Attendance: 710; Referee: Rob Hennessy (Ireland)

16 November 2026 Friendly	Andorra	1–3	Azerbaijan	Encamp, Andorra
19:00 UTC+1	Fernández 55'	Report	Ahmadov 2'; Qurbanlı 47'; T. Bayramov 70' (pen.)	Stadium: Estadi de la FAF; Referee: José Luis Munuera Montero (Spain)

== Coaching staff ==
Position	Name
Head coach	(Andorra) Koldo Álvarez
Sporting director	(Spain) Eloy Casals
General secretary	(Spain) David Rodrigo

=== Coaching history ===
As of 16 November 2026

Manager	Andorra career	Games	Won	Drawn	Lost	Win %
(Andorra) Isidre Codina	1996	1	0	0	1	0.0
(Brazil) Manoel Miluir	1997–1999	13	0	2	11	0.0
(Spain) David Rodrigo	1999–2009	75	3	7	65	4.0
(Andorra) Koldo Álvarez	2010–	148	14	23	111	9.5

== Players ==
=== Current squad ===
The following players are included in the squad for the friendly match against Azerbaijan on 16 November 2026.

Caps and goals correct as of 16 November 2026, after the match against Azerbaijan.

No.	Pos.	Player	Date of birth (age)	Caps	Goals	Club
1	GK	Josep Gómes	3 December 1985 (age 40)	89	0	(Andorran Football Federation) Casa de Portugal
12	GK	Marc de Castro	11 March 2004 (age 22)	1	0	(Royal Spanish Football Federation) Alcalá
13	GK	Álex Ruiz	3 September 1991 (age 35)	6	0	(Andorran Football Federation) Casa de Portugal
2	DF	Àlex Cornella	18 September 2006 (age 20)	3	0	(Royal Spanish Football Federation) Rubí
4	DF	Christian García	4 February 1999 (age 27)	34	0	(Andorran Football Federation) Atlètic d'Escaldes
5	DF	Max Llovera	8 January 1997 (age 29)	97	1	(Royal Spanish Football Federation) San Cristóbal
6	DF	Kiko Pomares	21 September 1998 (age 28)	15	0	(Royal Spanish Football Federation) Tarancón
15	DF	Moisés San Nicolás (captain)	17 September 1993 (age 33)	107	1	(Andorran Football Federation) FC Santa Coloma
21	DF	Iker Álvarez	16 September 2003 (age 23)	1	0	(Andorran Football Federation) Rànger's
22	DF	Ian Olivera	5 October 2004 (age 22)	25	1	(Royal Spanish Football Federation) Getafe B
23	DF	Biel Borra	22 October 2005 (age 21)	21	0	(Royal Spanish Football Federation) Olot
3	MF	Éric Vales	18 August 2000 (age 26)	25	0	(Andorran Football Federation) Casa de Portugal
7	MF	Nil Linares	17 December 2005 (age 20)	3	0	(Royal Spanish Football Federation) Viladecans
8	MF	Hugo Ferreira	12 July 2004 (age 22)	7	0	(Royal Spanish Football Federation) Europa B
14	MF	Jordi Aláez	23 January 1998 (age 28)	71	4	(Andorran Football Federation) Atlètic d'Escaldes
16	MF	Eric de las Heras	13 January 2002 (age 24)	17	0	(Royal Spanish Football Federation) Socuéllamos
17	MF	Aron Rodrigo	7 October 2004 (age 22)	17	0	(Royal Spanish Football Federation) Mirandés
18	MF	Ot Remolins	25 February 2004 (age 22)	11	0	(Royal Spanish Football Federation) Oviedo B
19	MF	Joel Guillén	28 August 2001 (age 25)	25	0	(Royal Spanish Football Federation) Binéfar
9	FW	Ricard Fernández	19 March 1999 (age 27)	63	3	(Andorran Football Federation) Casa de Portugal
10	FW	Guillaume López	30 January 1999 (age 27)	19	3	(Andorran Football Federation) FC Santa Coloma
11	FW	Albert Rosas	19 August 2002 (age 24)	32	6	(Royal Spanish Football Federation) UD Logroñés
20	FW	Gerard Solà	4 April 2004 (age 22)	7	0	(Royal Spanish Football Federation) Tudelano

=== Recent call-ups ===
The following players have been called up to the Andorra squad in the last 12 months.

Pos.	Player	Date of birth (age)	Caps	Goals	Club	Latest call-up
GK	Iker Álvarez	25 July 2001 (age 25)	43	0	(Spain) Córdoba	v. Gibraltar, 13 November 2026
GK	Mauro Rabelo	1 July 2002 (age 24)	0	0	(Andorra) FC Santa Coloma	v. San Marino, 31 March 2026
DF	Marc García	21 March 1988 (age 38)	80	0	(Spain) Binéfar	v. Gibraltar, 13 November 2026
DF	Jesús Rubio	9 September 1994 (age 32)	56	1	(Andorra) Atlètic d'Escaldes	v. Malta, 4 October 2026
DF	Eric de Pablos ^{PRE}	8 March 1999 (age 27)	14	0	(Andorra) Rànger's	v. Malta, 24 September 2026
DF	Dacu	16 May 2001 (age 25)	14	0	(Andorra) Inter d'Escaldes	v. San Marino, 31 March 2026
MF	Àlex Martínez	10 October 1998 (age 28)	67	2	(Andorra) Atlètic d'Escaldes	v. Malta, 4 October 2026
MF	João Teixeira	17 July 1996 (age 30)	20	0	(Portugal) Vilar de Perdizes	v. Malta, 4 October 2026
MF	Pau Babot	20 August 2003 (age 23)	17	0	(Germany) Bayern Alzenau	v. Malta, 4 October 2026
MF	Izan Fernández	3 October 2001 (age 25)	16	0	(Andorra) Rànger's	v. Malta, 4 October 2026
MF	Marc Vales	4 April 1990 (age 36)	107	5	(Gibraltar) Europa	v. Kosovo, 7 June 2026
MF	Marc Pujol ^{RET}	21 August 1982 (age 44)	124	5	Unattached	v. Liechtenstein, 4 June 2026
Notes: ^{INJ} = Withdrew due to injury; ^{PRE} = Preliminary squad / standby; ^{RET} = Retired from the national team

== Records ==
As of 16 November 2026
Players in bold are still active with Andorra.

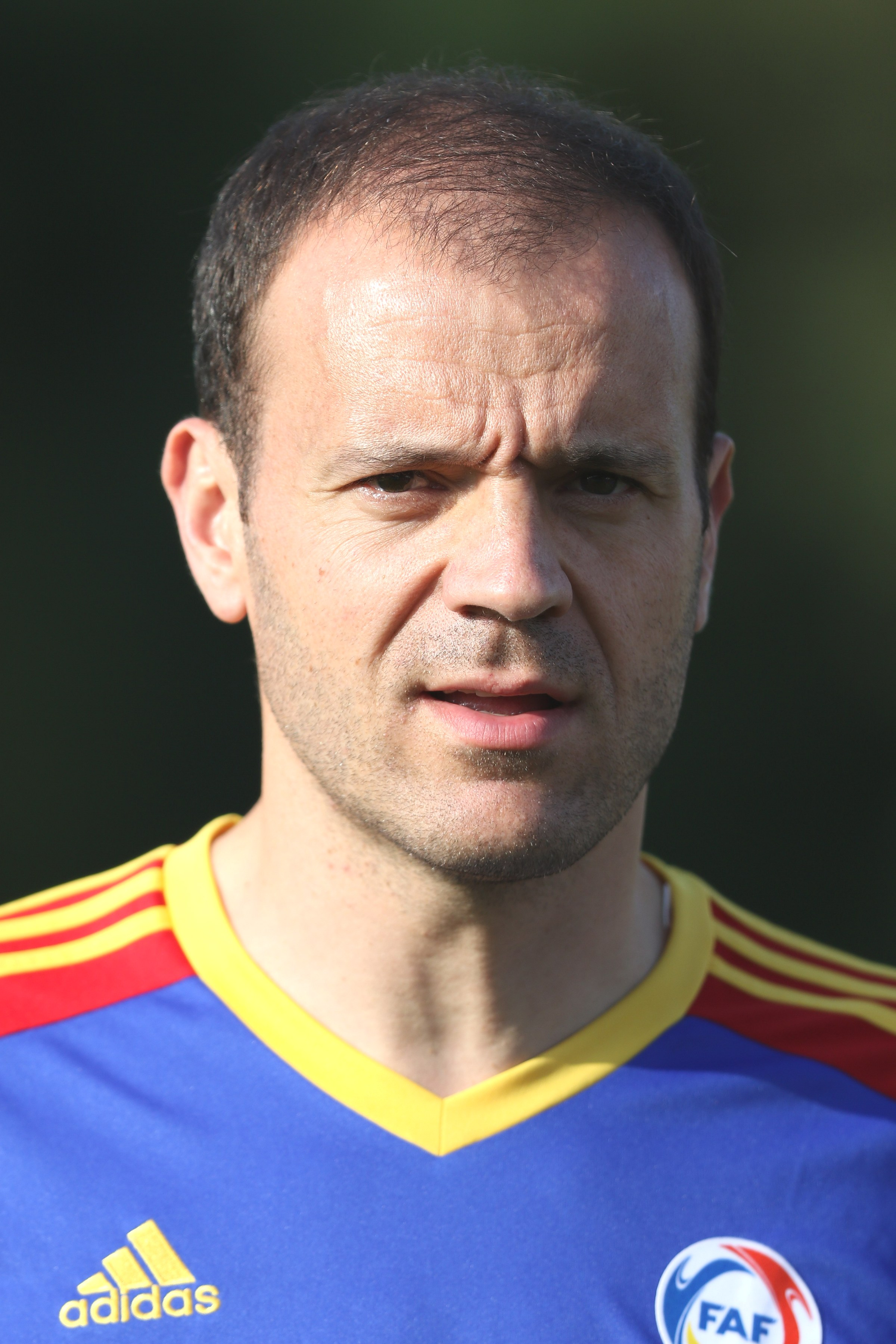
Ildefons Lima is Andorra's top goalscorer and their most-capped player

=== Most appearances ===
Rank	Player	Caps	Goals	Career
1	Ildefons Lima	137	11	1997–2023
2	Márcio Vieira	129	2	2005–2024
3	Marc Pujol	124	5	2000–2026
4	**Marc Vales**	107	5	2008–present
4	**Moisés San Nicolás**	107	1	2012–present
6	Óscar Sonejee	106	4	1997–2015
7	**Max Llovera**	97	1	2015–present
8	**Josep Gómes**	89	0	2006–present
9	Josep Ayala	84	1	2002–2017
10	**Marc García**	80	0	2010–present

=== Top goalscorers ===
Rank	Player	Goals	Caps	Ratio	Career
1	Ildefons Lima	11	137	0.08	1997–2023
2	**Albert Rosas**	6	32	0.19	2021–present
3	Cristian Martínez	5	77	0.06	2009–2021
3	**Marc Vales**	5	107	0.05	2008–present
3	Marc Pujol	5	124	0.04	2000–2026
6	**Jordi Aláez**	4	71	0.06	2016–present
6	Óscar Sonejee	4	106	0.04	1997–2015
8	**Guillaume López**	3	19	0.16	2025–present
8	Jesús Lucendo	3	29	0.1	1996–2003
8	Emiliano González	3	37	0.08	1998–2003
8	**Ricard Fernández**	3	63	0.05	2018–present
8	**Marc Rebés**	3	68	0.04	2015–present

== Competition records ==
=== FIFA World Cup ===
Year	FIFA World Cup record							Qualification record						
Year	Round	Pld	W	D	L	GF	GA	Pos.	Pld	W	D	L	GF	GA
1930 to 1994	Not a FIFA member							Not a FIFA member						
(France) 1998	Did not enter							Did not enter						
(South Korea) (Japan) 2002	Did not qualify							6th	10	0	0	10	5	36
(Germany) 2006	Did not qualify							7th	12	1	2	9	4	34
(South Africa) 2010	Did not qualify							6th	10	0	0	10	3	39
(Brazil) 2014	Did not qualify							6th	10	0	0	10	0	30
(Russia) 2018	Did not qualify							6th	10	1	1	8	2	23
(Qatar) 2022	Did not qualify							5th	10	2	0	8	8	24
(Canada) (Mexico) (United States) 2026	Did not qualify							5th	8	0	1	7	3	16
(Morocco) (Portugal) (Spain) 2030	To be determined							To be determined						
(Saudi Arabia) 2034	To be determined							To be determined						
Total	0/7	–	–	–	–	–	–	—	70	4	4	62	25	202

Draws include knockout matches decided via penalty shoot-out; correct as of 13 November 2025, after the match against Albania.

=== UEFA European Championship ===
Year	UEFA European Championship record							Qualification record						
Year	Round	Pld	W	D	L	GF	GA	Pos.	Pld	W	D	L	GF	GA
(France) 1960 to (England) 1996	Did not enter							Did not enter						
(Belgium) (Netherlands) 2000	Did not qualify							6th	10	0	0	10	3	28
(Portugal) 2004	Did not qualify							5th	8	0	0	8	1	18
(Austria) (Switzerland) 2008	Did not qualify							7th	12	0	0	12	2	42
(Poland) (Ukraine) 2012	Did not qualify							6th	10	0	0	10	1	25
(France) 2016	Did not qualify							6th	10	0	0	10	4	36
(European Union) 2020	Did not qualify							5th	10	1	1	8	3	20
(Germany) 2024	Did not qualify							6th	10	0	2	8	3	20
(England) (Scotland) (Republic of Ireland) (Wales) 2028	To be determined							To be determined						
(Italy) (Turkey) 2032	To be determined							To be determined						
Total	0/17	–	–	–	–	–	–	—	70	1	3	66	17	189

Draws include knockout matches decided via penalty shoot-out; correct as of 21 November 2023, after the match against Israel.

=== UEFA Nations League ===
UEFA Nations League record
Season	Division	Group	Pld	W	D	L	GF	GA	P/R	Rank
2018–19	D	1	6	0	4	2	2	9	Same position	53rd
2020–21	D	1	6	0	2	4	1	11	Same position	55th
2022–23	D	1	6	2	2	2	6	7	Same position	53rd
2024–25	D	2	4	0	1	3	0	4	Same position	54th
2026–27	D	1	4	1	1	2	3	3	▲	52nd
Total			26	3	10	13	12	34	52nd	

== Head-to-head record ==
Key
Positive balance (more Wins)
Neutral balance (Wins = Losses)
Negative balance (more Losses)

Last match updated was against Azerbaijan on 16 November 2026. Goal difference used to determine placement if results totals of two opponents are identical.

Team	From	To	P	W	D	L	Win %	GF	GA	GD
Latvia	1997	2025	13	0	5	8	0%	4	26	–22
Estonia	1996	2025	13	0	1	12	0%	5	28	–23
Moldova	2011	2024	10	1	2	7	10%	4	13	–9
Albania	2000	2025	9	1	1	7	11.11%	4	15	–11
Malta	2000	2026	8	0	4	4	0%	4	9	–5
Armenia	1998	2011	8	0	1	7	0%	2	20	–18
Iceland	1999	2019	7	0	0	7	0%	0	18	–18
Belarus	2000	2023	6	1	1	4	16.67%	4	12	–8
North Macedonia	2004	2011	6	1	1	4	16.67%	1	9	–8
Hungary	2012	2021	6	1	0	5	16.67%	3	17	–14
Azerbaijan	1998	2026	6	0	4	2	0%	2	5	–3
Israel	2006	2023	6	0	0	6	0%	3	18	–15
Russia	1999	2011	6	0	0	6	0%	2	21	–19
Romania	2004	2023	6	0	0	6	0%	1	21	–20
Netherlands	2001	2013	6	0	0	6	0%	0	21	–21
Croatia	2003	2009	6	0	0	6	0%	0	24	–24
Portugal	1999	2020	6	0	0	6	0%	1	29	–28
England	2006	2025	6	0	0	6	0%	0	28	–28
San Marino	2017	2026	5	4	1	0	80%	9	0	+9
Liechtenstein	2012	2026	5	4	0	1	80%	7	2	+5
Gibraltar	2021	2026	5	1	2	2	25%	2	2	0
Faroe Islands	1999	2020	5	0	2	3	0%	0	4	–4
Republic of Ireland	2001	2021	5	0	0	5	0%	3	15	–12
Cyprus	2000	2015	5	0	0	5	0%	3	17	–14
France	1998	2019	5	0	0	5	0%	0	14	–14
Kazakhstan	2008	2018	4	0	1	3	0%	2	11	–9
Switzerland	2016	2023	4	0	0	4	0%	2	10	–8
Turkey	2013	2019	4	0	0	4	0%	0	10	–10
Belgium	2002	2015	4	0	0	4	0%	1	14	–13
Ukraine	1998	2009	4	0	0	4	0%	0	17	–17
Kosovo	2023	2026	3	0	1	2	0%	1	7	–6
Finland	2004	2025	3	0	1	2	0%	0	7	–7
Lithuania	1998	2026	3	0	0	3	0%	1	10	–9
Poland	2012	2021	3	0	0	3	0%	1	11	–10
Saint Kitts and Nevis	2015	2022	2	1	0	1	50%	1	1	0
Cape Verde	2018	2020	2	0	1	1	0%	1	2	–1
Georgia	2018	2018	2	0	1	1	0%	1	4	–3
Slovakia	2011	2011	2	0	0	2	0%	0	2	–2
Wales	2014	2015	2	0	0	2	0%	1	4	–3
Bulgaria	2002	2003	2	0	0	2	0%	1	5	–4
Serbia	2025	2025	2	0	0	2	0%	1	6	–5
Bosnia and Herzegovina	2015	2015	2	0	0	2	0%	0	6	–6
Spain	2004	2024	2	0	0	2	0%	0	9	–9
Czech Republic	2005	2005	2	0	0	2	0%	1	12	–11
Grenada	2022	2022	1	1	0	0	100%	1	0	+1
South Africa	2024	2024	1	0	1	0	0%	1	1	0
China	2004	2004	1	0	1	0	0%	0	0	0
United Arab Emirates	2018	2018	1	0	1	0	0%	0	0	0
Equatorial Guinea	2015	2015	1	0	0	1	0%	0	1	–1
Indonesia	2014	2014	1	0	0	1	0%	0	1	–1
Qatar	2017	2017	1	0	0	1	0%	0	1	–1
Austria	2022	2022	1	0	0	1	0%	0	1	–1
Bolivia	2024	2024	1	0	0	1	0%	0	1	–1
Iraq	2026	2026	1	0	0	1	0%	0	1	–1
Gabon	2003	2003	1	0	0	1	0%	0	2	–2
Northern Ireland	2024	2024	1	0	0	1	0%	0	2	–2
Montenegro	2026	2026	1	0	0	1	0%	0	2	–2
Brazil	1998	1998	1	0	0	1	0%	0	3	–3
TOTAL	1996	2026	237	16	33	188	6.75%	81	552	–471

Notes:

- FIFA-unofficial match on 19 February 1998 between Andorra – Czech Republic (0–1) is not included.
