= Marc Bernaus =

Andorran footballer (born 1977)

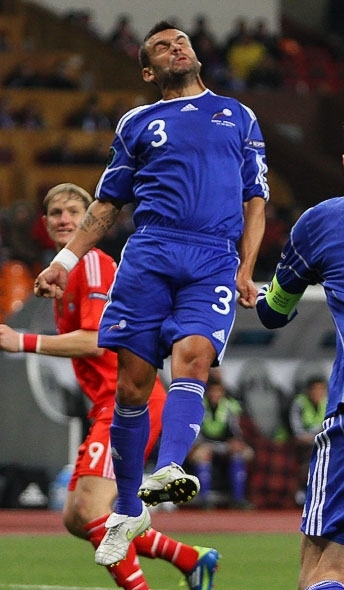
- Bernaus in action for Andorra in 2011

Personal information
- Full name: Marc Bernaus Cano
- Date of birth: 2 February 1977 (age 49)
- Place of birth: Andorra la Vella, Andorra
- Height: 1.70 m (5 ft 7 in)
- Position: Left back

Youth career
- 1994–1995: Barcelona

Senior career*
Years	Team	Apps	(Gls)
1995–1999	Barcelona B	68	(2)
1995–1996	Barcelona C	22	(1)
1999	Toledo	9	(0)
2000	Terrassa	2	(0)
2000–2002	Gimnàstic	51	(0)
2002–2003	Las Palmas	27	(0)
2003–2004	Getafe	33	(0)
2004–2007	Elche	92	(0)
2007–2008	Poli Ejido	24	(0)
2008–2010	Girona	21	(0)
2013	Llagostera B	3	(2)
Total		352	(5)

International career
1994	Spain U18	3	(1)
1997	Spain U20	7	(0)
2000–2013	Andorra	32	(1)
- * Club domestic league appearances and goals

Marc Bernaus Cano (born 2 February 1977) is an Andorran former footballer who played as a left back.

== Club career ==
Born in Andorra la Vella, Bernaus was a FC Barcelona youth graduate. He could never appear for the first team in La Liga, playing four seasons in Segunda División and another in Segunda División B with the B side. During his spell with the Blaugrana, he suffered a serious anterior cruciate ligament injury to his right knee that hindered his professional career.

Bernaus made 286 overall appearances whilst competing in the second tier of Spanish football (275 in the league, 11 in the Copa del Rey), also representing CD Toledo, Terrassa FC, Gimnàstic de Tarragona, UD Las Palmas, Getafe CF, Elche CF, Polideportivo Ejido and Girona FC. His biggest achievement came in the 2003–04 season, when he helped Madrid's Getafe to its first top-flight promotion by playing 33 out of 42 matches; he also suffered, however, five relegations, two of those with Barcelona's reserves.

== International career ==
After having appeared for Spain at youth level, Bernaus opted to represent Andorra, his homeland, as a senior. On 13 October 2004, he entered the minnow footballing nation's history books when he scored the game's only goal against Republic of Macedonia in the 2006 FIFA World Cup qualifiers for their first ever competitive win.

=== International goal ===
Scores and results list Andorra's goal tally first.

No.	Date	Venue	Opponent	Score	Result	Competition
1.	13 October 2004	Estadi Comunal d'Aixovall, Andorra La Vella, Andorra	Republic of Macedonia	1–0	1–0	2006 World Cup qualification
