= Pedro Avelino =

Municipality in Rio Grande do Norte, Brazil

Coordinates: 5°31′S 36°23′W

- Municipality
- Flag Coat of arms
- Interactive map of Pedro Avelino
- Country: Brazil
- Region: Nordeste
- State: Rio Grande do Norte
- Mesoregion: Central Potiguar

Population (2020)
  - Total: 6,653
- Time zone: UTC−3 (BRT)

Pedro Avelino is a municipality in the state of Rio Grande do Norte in the Northeast region of Brazil.

== History ==
From 1530 until the mid-eighteenth century the Brazilian lands were donated to grantees, and these were shared with others in "sesmarias" (it was a plot of land distributed to a beneficiary, in the name of the king of Portugal, with the objective of cultivating originated as an administrative measure in the final periods of the Middle Ages in Portugal, the concession of sesmarias was widely used in the Brazilian colonial period).

The captaincy of Rio Grande do Norte belonged to João de Barros, Portuguese writer and nobleman. Although he was chosen by King João III to explore the captaincy, he never came to Brazil and decided to divide it into sesmarias. On July 22, 1786, Colonel Antônio Barros Bezerra was granted the lands that enclose the municipality in agreement between the grantee and the King of Portugal. This citizen, according to the Decree, would own the land for 200 years. The first inhabitants and tenants were the Portuguese brothers: Diogo, Gaspar, Jacinto and Felix Lopes dos Reis.

After ten years, other families arrived, attracted by the fertility and space offered by the sesmeiros, who later formed the genealogical tree of the Pedro-avelinense people. The families were: Câmara, Inácio da Costa, Batista, Leocádio, Bezerra, Xavier de Meneses, Pereira Pinto, Ferreira, Medeiros and Araújo.

In 1866, Professor Francisco Januário Xavier de Meneses established the first school. In 1877, there was a great drought. As the village had a large lagoon (in the center of town) with plenty of water and fish, the village grew. In the same year the builder Manoel Cabral de Macedo built a public cemetery on the banks of the Gaspar Lopes River. In 1912 the free fair was created on Sundays (at Rua Ernesto da Costa - Rua Velha). In 1916 the chapel of Santa Luzia was erected by the masons João Cândido and João Gomes, where he had in front of the emblem of the Holy Cross, (now José Alves da Câmara Square) being vicar of the parish Father Ulisses Maranhão. In 1920 the construction of the public market was initiated by the Mayor of Angicos.

On 24-12-1921, Gaspar Lopes was renamed Epitácio Pessoa, in honor of the great Northeastern President whose motto was: To govern and open roads, and brought the railroad to the village. On 08-01-1922 the railway was inaugurated, and the growth of the village was great and prosperous because it was the end of the branch.

Gentílico: pedro-avelinense.

Then the District created with the denomination of Epitácio Pessoa, by the state decree nº 603, of 31-101938, subordinated to the municipality of Angicos.

In the framework established for the period 1939-1943, the district of Epitácio Pessoa, is in the municipality of Angicos.

High to the category of municipality with the denomination of Pedro Avelino, by the state decree nº 146, of 23-12-1948, dismembered of Angicos. Headquarters in the current district of Pedro Avelino former Epitácio Pessoa. Constituted of the district headquarters. Installed on 01-01-1949.

In a territorial division dated from 1-VII-1960, the municipality already named Pedro Avelino is constituted of the district headquarters.

Thus remaining in territorial division dated 2007.

District toponymic change

Epitácio Pessoa for Pedro Avelino modified, by state law nº 146, of 23-12-1948.

== See also ==
- List of municipalities in Rio Grande do Norte
