= Andorra national under-21 football team =

Andorra U21
- Nickname: Tricolors (The Tricolours)
- Association: Federació Andorrana de Fútbol
- Head coach: Eloy Casals
- Captain: Gerard Solà
- Most caps: Gerard Solà (25)
- Top scorer: Gerard Solà (5)
- Home stadium: Estadi de la FAF, Encamp
First colours	Second colours

First international
- Andorra 0–0 Iceland; Andorra la Vella, 3 May 2006

Biggest win
- Andorra 4–0 Republic of Ireland; Andorra la Vella, 18 November 2025

Biggest defeat
- Czech Republic 8–0 Andorra; Mladá Boleslav, 10 August 2011; Netherlands 8–0 Andorra; Doetinchem, 10 November 2017

UEFA U-21 Championship
- Appearances: None

The Andorra national under-21 football team is the national under-21 football team of Andorra and is controlled by the Andorran Football Federation.

The team played the first match against Iceland, in an extra preliminary round for the 2007 European Under-21 Football Championship. They drew the first game 0–0 at home and lost the away leg 2–0. Andorra under-21 did not take part in the 2009 Under-21 European Championship qualifying, but was back again for the 2011 Under-21 Championship qualifying in 2009. They won their first competitive match on 16 June 2015, beating Lithuania 1–0 at home.

== UEFA U-21 Championship record ==
UEFA U-21 Championship record									UEFA U-21 Championship Qualification record						
Year	Round	Pld	W	D	L	GF	GA	GD	Pld	W	D	L	GF	GA	GD
(Netherlands) 2007	Did not qualify								2	0	1	1	0	2	−2
(Sweden) 2009	Did not enter								Did not enter						
(Denmark) 2011	Did not qualify								10	0	1	9	3	25	−22
(Israel) 2013	Did not qualify								8	0	0	8	2	32	−30
(Czech Republic) 2015	Did not qualify								10	0	1	9	1	35	−34
(Poland) 2017	Did not qualify								10	1	0	9	1	26	−25
(Italy) (San Marino) 2019	Did not qualify								10	0	3	7	1	28	−27
(Hungary) (Slovenia) 2021	Did not qualify								10	1	2	7	10	24	−14
(Romania) (Georgia (country)) 2023	Did not qualify								10	0	0	10	1	28	−27
(Slovakia) 2025	Did not qualify								10	0	3	7	4	16	−12
(Albania) (Serbia) 2027	Did not qualify								10	2	2	6	7	12	−5
Total	0/10								90	4	13	73	30	228	−197

== Players ==
=== Current squad ===
The following players are included in the squad for the UEFA European Under-21 Championship qualifairs matches against Moldova and Slovakia.

Caps and goals correct as of 4 October 2026, after the match against Slovakia

No.	Pos.	Player	Date of birth (age)	Caps	Goals	Club
1	GK	Adrià Cornella	10 February 2004 (age 22)	0	0	(Royal Spanish Football Federation) San Marcial
13	GK	Marc de Castro	11 March 2004 (age 22)	16	0	(Royal Spanish Football Federation) Alcalá
2	DF	Daniel de Lima	12 April 2007 (age 19)	4	0	(Andorran Football Federation) Sant Julià
3	DF	Pau Miranda	18 January 2007 (age 19)	2	0	(Royal Spanish Football Federation) Poble Sec
4	DF	Daniel de Sa	28 June 2007 (age 19)	10	0	(Portuguese Football Federation) Courense
5	DF	Àlex Cornella	18 September 2006 (age 20)	11	0	(Royal Spanish Football Federation) Rubí
8	DF	Guillem Acosta	4 February 2006 (age 20)	20	0	Unattached
21	DF	Marc Rodríguez	21 June 2005 (age 21)	18	0	(Andorran Football Federation) Inter d'Escaldes
6	MF	Pere Simonet	23 January 2007 (age 19)	7	0	(Royal Spanish Football Federation) Martinenc
7	MF	Marcel Carrau	18 September 2005 (age 21)	6	0	(Andorran Football Federation) Esperança
10	MF	Yedid Santaella	12 July 2007 (age 19)	10	0	(Royal Spanish Football Federation) Caldes
11	MF	Nil Linares	17 December 2005 (age 20)	21	0	(Royal Spanish Football Federation) Viladecans
15	MF	Marc Torné	27 March 2005 (age 21)	8	0	(Royal Spanish Football Federation) Poble Sec
18	MF	Albert Solanes	1 March 2007 (age 19)	6	0	(Royal Spanish Football Federation) Poble Sec
19	MF	Haroun Dchar	10 June 2006 (age 20)	3	0	(Andorran Football Federation) Penya Encarnada
20	MF	Pau Silva	7 April 2004 (age 22)	11	0	(Royal Spanish Football Federation) Ribert
9	FW	Gerard Solà (C)	4 April 2004 (age 22)	25	5	(Royal Spanish Football Federation) Tudelano
14	FW	Iván Rodríguez	18 September 2005 (age 21)	6	1	(Andorran Football Federation) Penya Encarnada
16	FW	Jan Rodríguez	21 May 2007 (age 19)	3	0	Unattached
17	FW	Àlex Rente	23 August 2004 (age 22)	12	0	(Andorran Football Federation) Sporting d'Escaldes

=== Recent call-ups ===
The following players have been called up for the team within the last 12 months and are still eligible to represent.

Pos.	Player	Date of birth (age)	Caps	Goals	Club	Latest call-up
DF	Ian Olivera	5 October 2004 (age 22)	13	1	(Spain) Getafe B	v. England, 27 March 2026
DF	Biel Borra ^{PRE}	22 October 2005 (age 21)	11	0	(Spain) Olot	v. England, 27 March 2026
DF	Guillem Carrau	18 September 2005 (age 21)	1	0	(Andorra) Esperança	v. England, 27 March 2026
MF	Ot Remolins	25 February 2004 (age 22)	23	0	(Spain) Oviedo B	v. England, 27 March 2026
MF	Hugo Ferreira	12 July 2004 (age 22)	13	1	(Spain) Europa B	v. England, 27 March 2026
MF	Nelson Mendes	4 March 2004 (age 22)	2	0	(Andorra) Carroi	v. England, 27 March 2026
FW	Jan Gumà	27 September 2006 (age 20)	11	0	(United States) Binghamton Bearcats	v. England, 27 March 2026

Notes

- Players in italics have been capped for the senior team.

== Records ==
=== Most appearances ===
Rank	Player	Caps	Goals	Career
1	Gerard Solà	25	5	2021–
2	Eric de las Heras	24	1	2019–2024
3	Ot Remolins	23	0	2021–
4	Nil Linares	21	0	2022–
5	Éric Vales	20	0	2018–2022
5	Albert Rosas	20	4	2019–2024
5	Guillem Acosta	20	0	2022–
8	Albert Reyes	19	0	2014–2018
9	Xavier Vieira	18	1	2011–2014
9	Àlex Martínez	18	0	2015–2020
9	Joel Guillén	18	0	2019–2022
9	Izan Fernández	18	0	2019–2022
9	Pau Babot	18	0	2021–2024

=== Top goalscorers ===
Rank	Player	Goals	Caps	Ratio	Career
1	Gerard Solà	5	25	0.2	2021–
2	Jordi Aláez	4	15	0.267	2015–2020
2	Ricard Fernández	4	15	0.267	2016–2020
2	Albert Rosas	4	20	0.2	2019–2024

== See also ==
- Andorra national football team
- Andorra national under-17 football team
- Andorra national under-19 football team
