= CE Europa B =

- Full name: Club Esportiu Europa "B"
- Nicknames: Escapulats; Europeistes; Graciencs
- Founded: August 2012; 14 years ago
- Ground: Nou Sardenya, Barcelona, Catalonia, Spain
- Capacity: 4,000
- President: Hèctor Ibar
- Head coach: Jonathan Ruiz
- League: Tercera Federación – Group 5
- 2025–26: Tercera Federación – Group 5, 10th of 18
- Website: http://www.ceeuropa.cat
Home colours	Away colours	Third colours

Club Esportiu Europa B is a Catalan football team based in the city of Barcelona, with close links to the Vila de Gràcia, in the autonomous community of Catalonia, Spain. Founded in 2012, they are the reserve team of CE Europa, and play in the Tercera Federación – Group 5.

== History ==
In 2002, Europa reached an agreement with UE Caprabo in the Preferent Territorial, converting this club in the reserve team of Europa. The club's name changed to UE Caprabo Europa B, but maintained its distinctive identity. The first notable success was the promotion to the Primera Catalana in 2006.

Even though it seemed that the club would be integrated entirely in the structure of Europa, the collaboration stopped in 2007, coinciding with a relegation. Later, UE Caprabo was absorbed by AE Josep Maria Gené.

In 2012–13, CE Europa B was born, a reserve team that formed part of Europa from the beginning. The team started to compete in the Quarta Catalana, the lowest competition possible. In 2022–23, Europa B achieved promotion to the Lliga Elit. In 2023–24, the team achieved promotion to Tercera Federación, achieving the team's entry into Spanish professional football starting with the 2024–25 season.

== Season to season ==
Season	Tier	Division	Place
2012–13	8	4ª Cat.	2nd
2013–14	8	4ª Cat.	1st
2014–15	7	3ª Cat.	2nd
2015–16	6	2ª Cat.	9th
2016–17	6	2ª Cat.	5th
2017–18	6	2ª Cat.	4th
2018–19	6	2ª Cat.	5th
2019–20	6	2ª Cat.	6th
2020–21	6	2ª Cat.	3rd
2021–22	7	2ª Cat.	1st
2022–23	6	1ª Cat.	5th
2023–24	6	Lliga Elit	1st
2024–25	5	3ª Fed.	10th
2025–26	5	3ª Fed.	10th
2026–27	5	3ª Fed.	

- 3 seasons in Tercera Federación

== Current squad ==
As of 22 April 2024

Note: Flags indicate national team as defined under FIFA eligibility rules; some limited exceptions apply. Players may hold more than one non-FIFA nationality.

No.	Pos.	Nation	Player
—	GK	ESP	Pol Cordero
—	GK	ESP	Martí Gilboy
—	DF	ESP	Sergi Basart
—	DF	ESP	Pol Morlans
—	DF	ESP	Sergi Batuecas
—	DF	ESP	Nil Lapido
—	DF	ESP	Marc Jurado
—	DF	ESP	Víctor Ibar
—	DF	ESP	Sicu Camara
—	DF	ESP	Dani González
—	DF	ESP	Èric Bezis

No.	Pos.	Nation	Player
—	MF	ESP	Albert Celma
—	MF	ESP	Guillem Cardelús
—	MF	ESP	Julen Vilarrasa
—	MF	ESP	Marcel Samsó
—	MF	ESP	Sergi Hernández
—	MF	ESP	Suleyman Drammeh
—	MF	ESP	Xavier Cabezas
—	FW	GAM	Abubacarry Juwara
—	FW	ESP	Badr El Shater
—	FW	ESP	Aiman Boussid
—	FW	ESP	Jandro Moreno
