= Koldo Álvarez =

Association football player and manager

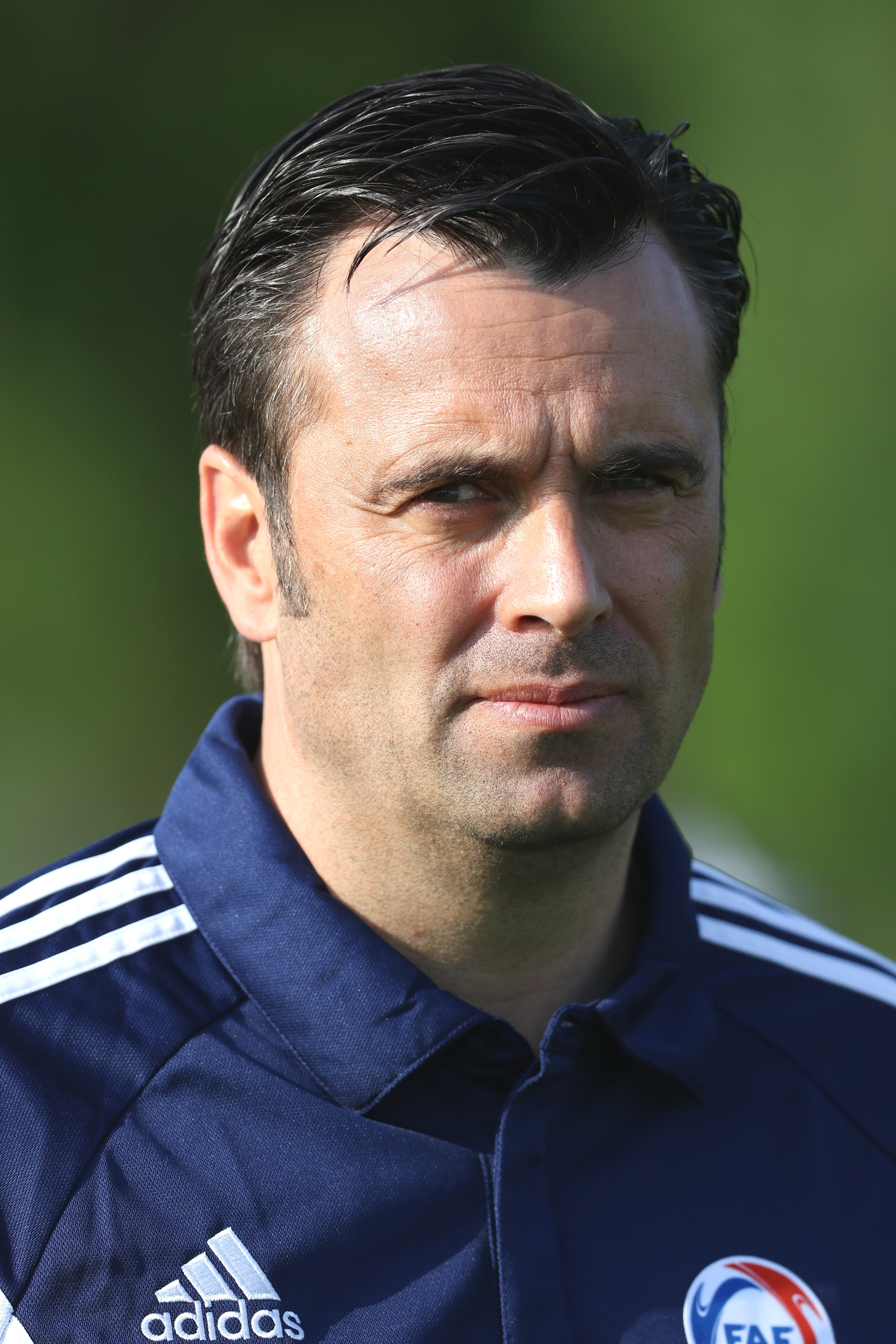
- Koldo managing Andorra in 2016

Personal information
- Full name: Jesús Luis Álvarez de Eulate Güergue
- Date of birth: 4 September 1970 (age 56)
- Place of birth: Vitoria, Spain
- Height: 1.90 m (6 ft 3 in)
- Position: Goalkeeper

Team information
- Current team: Andorra (coach)

Senior career*
Years	Team	Apps	(Gls)
1988–1989	Aurrerá		
1989–1993	Atlético Madrid B	52	(0)
1990	→ Toledo (loan)	15	(0)
1991	Atlético Madrid	0	(0)
1993–1994	Salamanca	0	(0)
1994–2006	FC Andorra	362	(0)
2007	Balaguer	10	(0)
2007–2009	FC Andorra	40	(0)
Total		479	(0)

International career
1998–2009	Andorra	78	(0)

Managerial career
- 2010–: Andorra
- * Club domestic league appearances and goals

Jesús Luis "Koldo" Álvarez de Eulate Güergue (born 4 September 1970) is a former footballer who played as a goalkeeper. He is currently manager of the Andorra national team.

== Playing career ==
Born in Vitoria-Gasteiz, Álava, Basque Country, Spain, Álvarez spent his entire career in the country. He signed in the 1990 summer transfer window with Atlético Madrid from local CD Aurrerá de Vitoria, but struggled to appear even for the reserves. Due to injury to starter Abel Resino, he was on the bench for the first team in the final of the 1990–91 Copa del Rey, against RCD Mallorca.

Álvarez resumed his career in the lower leagues, being second or third choice. In 1994, he joined FC Andorra who competed in the Spanish football league system, going on to remain 14 of the following 15 seasons with the club and retiring aged 39. After being naturalised, he began representing the Andorra national team, making his debut on 3 June 1998 in a 3–0 friendly loss to Brazil.

On 10 June 2009, Álvarez played his last international, a 6–0 defeat against England for the 2010 FIFA World Cup qualifiers; arguably one of the best players in the match, he received a standing ovation from the opposing fans for his efforts, after he was substituted in injury time. Previously, in November 2003, to celebrate UEFA's Jubilee, he was selected as Andorra's Golden Player by the Andorran Football Federation as their most outstanding player of the past 50 years.

== Coaching career ==
Álvarez was appointed as the Andorra national team's manager on 2 February 2010, replacing David Rodrigo. His first win (on his 49th game in charge) came seven years and 20 days later, 2–0 over San Marino in a friendly.

On 25 March 2017, nearly 12 years after the last point won in official matches, Álvarez led the side to a 0–0 draw with Faroe Islands for the 2018 World Cup qualifying campaign. On 9 June, for the same competition, a 1–0 win against Hungary in Andorra la Vella was achieved, the first competitive one since October 2004.

== Personal life ==
Álvarez's son, Iker, is also a footballer and a goalkeeper. He was coached by his father in the national team setup.

== Career statistics ==
=== International ===
Andorra
Year	Apps	Goals
1998	8	0
1999	8	0
2000	8	0
2001	3	0
2002	6	0
2003	7	0
2004	7	0
2005	8	0
2006	5	0
2007	9	0
2008	5	0
2009	4	0
Total	78	0

== Managerial statistics ==
As of match played 16 November 2026

Team	From	To	Record				
Team	From	To	G	W	D	L	Win %
Andorra	2 February 2010	Present	148	13	24	111	8.78

== Honours ==
Atlético Madrid

- Copa del Rey: 1990–91
