= CDJ Tamarite =

Association football club in Spain

Tamarite
- Full name: Club Deportivo Juvenil Tamarite
- Founded: 1960
- Ground: La Colomina, Tamarite de Litera, Aragon, Spain
- Capacity: 2,000
- Chairman: Juan Sánchez
- Manager: Félix Jiménez
- League: Tercera Federación – Group 17
- 2025–26: Tercera Federación – Group 17, 10th of 18
- Website: http://clubdeportivojuveniltamarite.blogspot.com/
Home colours	Away colours

Club Deportivo Juvenil Tamarite is a Spanish football team based in Tamarite de Litera, in the autonomous community of Aragon. Founded in 1960, it plays in Tercera Federación – Group 17, holding home matches at Estadio La Colomina.

== Season to season ==
Season	Tier	Division	Place	Copa del Rey
1962–63	5	2ª Reg.		
1963–64	4	1ª Reg.	5th	
1964–65	4	1ª Reg.	3rd	
1965–66	4	1ª Reg.	4th	
1966–67	4	1ª Reg.	14th	
1967–68	4	1ª Reg.	7th	
1968–69	4	Reg. Pref.	12th	
1969–70	4	Reg. Pref.	16th	
1970–71	5	1ª Reg.	11th	
1971–72	5	1ª Reg.	2nd	
1972–73	4	Reg. Pref.	17th	
1973–74	5	1ª Reg.	14th	
1974–75	6	2ª Reg. P.	5th	
1975–76	6	2ª Reg. P.	2nd	
1976–77	5	1ª Reg.	7th	
1977–78	5	Reg. Pref.	8th	
1978–79	5	Reg. Pref.	13th	
1979–80	5	Reg. Pref.	18th	
1980–81	5	Reg. Pref.	20th	
1981–82	6	1ª Reg.	14th	

Season	Tier	Division	Place	Copa del Rey
1982–83	6	1ª Reg.	19th	
1983–84	6	1ª Reg.	9th	
1984–85	6	1ª Reg.	3rd	
1985–86	6	1ª Reg.	2nd	
1986–87	6	1ª Reg.	2nd	
1987–88	5	Reg. Pref.	8th	
1988–89	5	Reg. Pref.	2nd	
1989–90	4	3ª	18th	
1990–91	5	Reg. Pref.	5th	
1991–92	5	Reg. Pref.	1st	
1992–93	4	3ª	11th	
1993–94	4	3ª	12th	
1994–95	4	3ª	11th	
1995–96	4	3ª	20th	
1996–97	5	Reg. Pref.	6th	
1997–98	5	Reg. Pref.	1st	
1998–99	4	3ª	17th	
1999–2000	5	Reg. Pref.	2nd	
2000–01	4	3ª	21st	
2001–02	5	Reg. Pref.	9th	

Season	Tier	Division	Place	Copa del Rey
2002–03	5	Reg. Pref.	8th	
2003–04	5	Reg. Pref.	16th	
2004–05	6	1ª Reg.	5th	
2005–06	6	1ª Reg.	3rd	
2006–07	6	1ª Reg.	3rd	
2007–08	6	1ª Reg.	3rd	
2008–09	6	1ª Reg.	2nd	
2009–10	5	Reg. Pref.	11th	
2010–11	5	Reg. Pref.	4th	
2011–12	5	Reg. Pref.	4th	
2012–13	5	Reg. Pref.	2nd	
2013–14	4	3ª	12th	
2014–15	4	3ª	17th	
2015–16	5	Reg. Pref.	2nd	
2016–17	4	3ª	11th	
2017–18	4	3ª	6th	
2018–19	4	3ª	15th	
2019–20	4	3ª	16th	
2020–21	4	3ª	9th / 8th	
2021–22	6	Reg. Pref.	1st	

Season	Tier	Division	Place	Copa del Rey
2022–23	5	3ª Fed.	5th	
2023–24	5	3ª Fed.	12th	
2024–25	5	3ª Fed.	9th	
2025–26	5	3ª Fed.	10th	
2026–27	5	3ª Fed.		

- 14 seasons in Tercera División
- 5 seasons in Tercera Federación
