= CE Casa de Portugal =

Casa de Portugal
- Full name: Club Esportiu Casa de Portugal
- Founded: 21 August 2020; 6 years ago
- League: Primera Divisió
- 2025–26: Segona Divisió, 1st (promoted)

Club Esportiu Casa de Portugal is an Andorran football club from Andorra la Vella, founded in 2020. The club plays in the top-flight Primera Divisió, having won promotion from the Segona Divisió in 2025–26.

== History ==
Casa de Portugal entered the Segona Divisió for the 2025–26 season. The club competed for the title against Sporting Club d'Escaldes. On 18 May 2026, the club won 3–1 against FS La Massana to win the second division and a place in the Primera Divisió for 2026–27.

In the Copa Constitució in 2026, Casa de Portugal won the first round against top-flight CE Carroi after a goalless draw and penalty shootout. The club fell in the quarter-finals 4–1 to reigning champions Inter Club d'Escaldes.

== Honours ==
- Segona Divisió: 2025–26
