= Andorra national under-17 football team =

Andorra U-17
- Nickname: Tricolors (The Tricolours)
- Association: Andorran Football Federation (Federació Andorrana de Futbol)
- Confederation: UEFA (Europe)
- Head coach: Filipe Busto
- Captain: Eric Cerqueda
- FIFA code: AND
First colours	Second colours

First international
- Andorra 0–10 Czech Republic (Andorra la Vella, Andorra; 3 March 1998)

Biggest win
- Andorra 3–0 San Marino (Andorra la Vella, Andorra; 6 October 2007); Andorra 3–0 Armenia (Dugopolje, Croatia; 2 November 2018)

Biggest defeat
- Andorra 0–11 Italy (Andorra la Vella, Andorra; 5 March 1998); Andorra 0–11 Croatia (Subotica, Serbia; 29 September 2004)

European Championship
- Appearances: 0

FIFA U-17 World Cup
- Appearances: 0

The Andorra national under-17 football team represents Andorra in international football at this age level and is controlled by Federació Andorrana de Futbol, the governing body for football in Andorra.

== UEFA U-16/17 European Championship record ==
UEFA U-16/17 European Championship record									UEFA U-16/17 Championship Qualification record						
Year	Round	Pld	W	D	L	GF	GA	GD	Pld	W	D	L	GF	GA	GD
(Scotland) 1998	Did not qualify								2	0	0	2	0	21	−21
(Czech Republic) 1999	Did not participate								-						
(Israel) 2000	Did not qualify								2	0	0	2	1	11	−10
(England) 2001	Did not qualify								3	0	1	2	1	15	−14
(Denmark) 2002	Did not qualify								2	0	0	2	1	6	−5
(Portugal) 2003	Did not qualify								3	0	0	3	2	17	−15
(France) 2004	Did not qualify								3	0	1	2	0	6	−6
(Italy) 2005	Did not qualify								3	0	0	3	0	22	−22
(Luxembourg) 2006	Did not qualify								3	0	0	3	0	16	−16
(Belgium) 2007	Did not qualify								3	0	0	3	0	9	−9
(Turkey) 2008	Did not qualify								3	1	0	2	3	4	−1
(Germany) 2009	Did not qualify								3	0	0	3	2	12	−10
(Liechtenstein) 2010	Did not qualify								3	0	1	2	0	6	−6
(Serbia) 2011	Did not qualify								3	0	1	2	0	10	−10
(Slovenia) 2012	Did not qualify								3	0	0	3	0	12	−12
(Slovakia) 2013	Did not qualify								3	0	1	2	2	14	−12
(Malta) 2014	Did not qualify								3	0	0	3	0	9	−9
(Bulgaria) 2015	Did not qualify								3	0	0	3	1	5	−4
(Azerbaijan) 2016	Did not qualify								3	0	0	3	0	6	−6
(Croatia) 2017	Did not qualify								3	0	0	3	1	10	−9
(England) 2018	Did not qualify								3	0	1	2	1	3	−2
(Republic of Ireland) 2019	Did not qualify								3	1	0	2	3	10	−7
(Estonia) 2020	Did not qualify								3	1	0	2	1	8	−7
(Israel) 2022	Did not qualify								3	0	0	3	0	12	−12
(Hungary) 2023	Did not qualify								3	0	1	2	2	9	−7
(Cyprus) 2024	Did not qualify								3	0	0	3	1	7	−6
(Albania) 2025	Did not qualify								6	1	1	4	2	16	−14
(Estonia) 2026	Did not qualify								6	1	1	4	5	14	−9
(Latvia) 2027	Did not qualify								3	0	0	3	1	12	−11
Total	0/25								85	4	9	72	30	302	−272

== Current squad ==
- The following players were called up for the 2027 UEFA European Under-17 Championship qualification.
- Matches dates: 12, 14 & 17 November 2026.
- Opposition: Portugal, Serbia, Bulgaria.
- Caps and goals correct as of: 17 November 2026, after the match against Bulgaria.

No.	Pos.	Player	Date of birth (age)	Caps	Goals	Club
1	GK	Nil Soares	18 October 2010 (age 16)	4	0	(Andorran Football Federation) Andorra U19
13	GK	Arnau Rodríguez-Escalona	31 October 2010 (age 16)	5	0	(Andorran Football Federation) ENFAF U19
3	DF	Iván Núñez	9 November 2010 (age 16)	3	0	(Andorran Football Federation) Andorra U19
4	DF	Héctor Ferreira	12 October 2010 (age 16)	5	0	(Andorran Football Federation) ENFAF U19
5	DF	Eric Cerqueda (C)	3 June 2010 (age 16)	12	0	(Andorran Football Federation) ENFAF U19
14	DF	Jordi Puig	23 June 2011 (age 15)	1	0	(Andorran Football Federation) ENFAF U16
20	DF	Sergi Vidal	19 January 2011 (age 15)	3	0	(Royal Spanish Football Federation) Balaguer U16
21	DF	Adrián del Amo	25 December 2010 (age 15)	2	0	(Andorran Football Federation) Andorra U19
6	MF	Biel Opoku	15 January 2010 (age 16)	2	0	(Andorran Football Federation) Andorra U19
8	MF	Adrián Casas	16 February 2010 (age 16)	3	0	(Andorran Football Federation) Andorra U19
9	MF	Jan Gracia	2 March 2010 (age 16)	3	0	(Andorran Football Federation) ENFAF U19
11	MF	Lucas Magalhães	12 May 2010 (age 16)	3	0	(Andorran Football Federation) Andorra U19
16	MF	Enzo Millán	24 November 2010 (age 15)	3	0	(Andorran Football Federation) Andorra U19
19	MF	Arnau Martínez	4 September 2010 (age 16)	1	0	(Andorran Football Federation) Andorra U19
2	FW	Ayan Sonejee	3 October 2010 (age 16)	5	0	(Andorran Football Federation) ENFAF U19
7	FW	Nil Fernández	11 August 2010 (age 16)	3	0	(Andorran Football Federation) ENFAF U19
10	FW	Marc Huguet	26 May 2010 (age 16)	9	1	(Royal Spanish Football Federation) Atlètic Segre U19
15	FW	Gerard Vidal	7 February 2011 (age 15)	1	0	(Andorran Football Federation) ENFAF U16
17	FW	Lucas Sousa	23 February 2011 (age 15)	2	0	(Andorran Football Federation) ENFAF U16
18	FW	Marc Ber	30 May 2011 (age 15)	3	0	(Royal Spanish Football Federation) Balaguer U16

== See also ==
- Andorra national football team
