= List of Andorra international footballers =

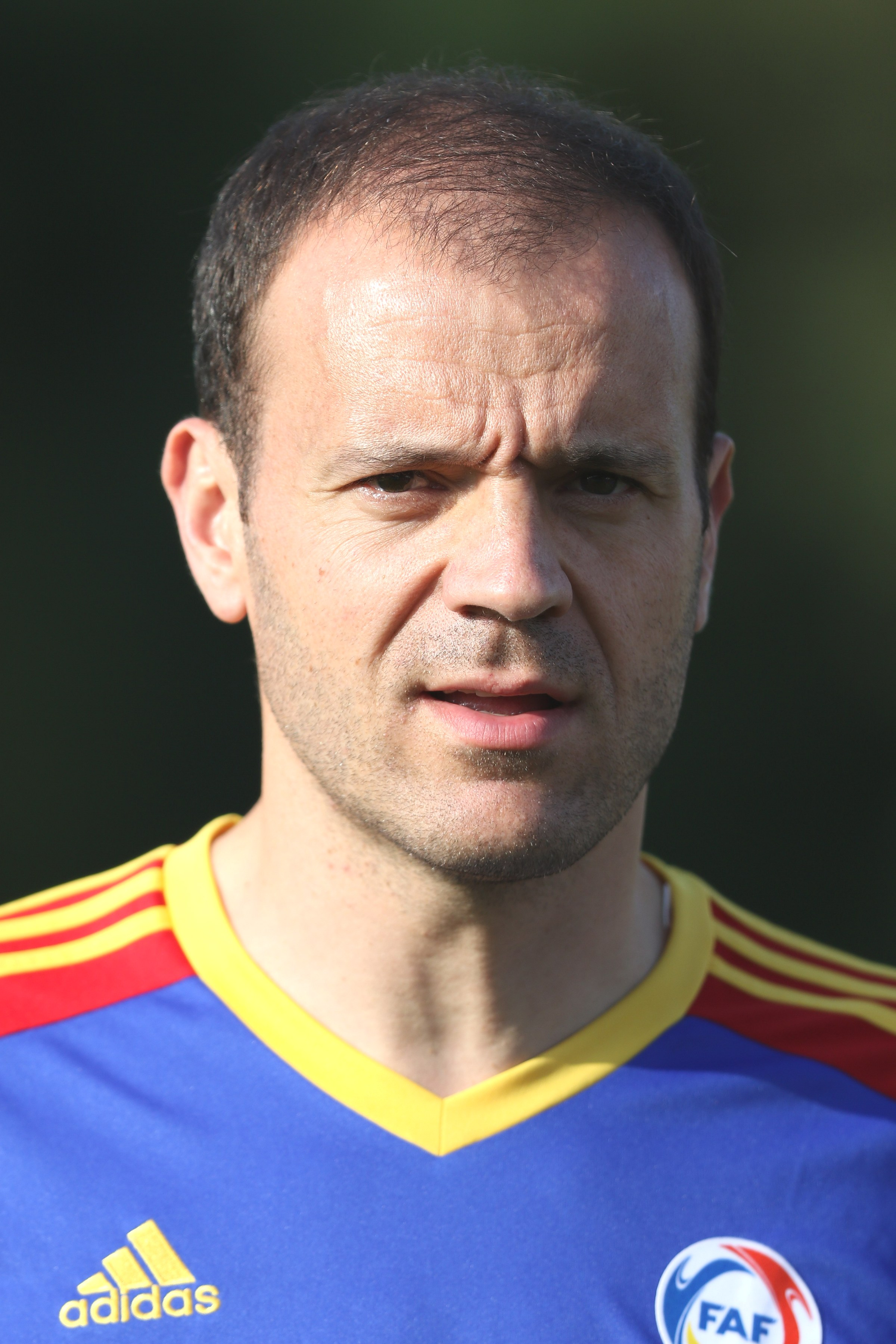
Ildefons Lima is the most capped player in Andorran history and is also the nation's record goalscorer.

The Andorra national football team has represented Andorra in international association football since 1996. Although the nation declared constitutional independence in March 1993, the national team was forced to wait three years before making its official debut until the side were accepted as members of the Union of European Football Associations (UEFA) and the International Federation of Association Football (FIFA). Andorra played their first official international fixture on 13 November 1996, a 6–1 defeat to Estonia in the Andorran capital city Andorra la Vella. The team is governed by the Andorran Football Federation (AFF) and compete as a member of UEFA, which encompasses the countries of Europe and Israel. As of October 2025, Andorra have played 235 matches, winning 15, drawing 33 and losing 187. Andorra have played Estonia and Latvia more than any other international sides, though they have not beaten either opponent in their 13 meetings with either team. In global and continental competitions, the team has competed in qualification groups for both the FIFA World Cup, since 2002, and the UEFA European Championship, since 2000, but have failed to qualify for any tournament finals; since 2018, the team has competed in the UEFA Nations League.

Spanish-born defender Ildefons Lima is the nation's most capped player, with 137 appearances, having made his international debut in June 1997 against Estonia and his farewell against Switzerland in September 2023. He broke the record held by Óscar Sonejee on 16 August 2017 after playing in a friendly match against Qatar. Lima, Márcio Vieira, Marc Pujol, Marc Vales, Sonejee and Moisés San Nicolás are the only players to have achieved 100 caps for the Andorran national side. Despite playing as a defender, Lima is also the nation's leading goalscorer of all time, scoring eleven goals, and is the only player to have scored more than five goals for the side.

The first player to reach 25 caps for Andorra was Txema Garcia, on 2 September 2000 in a 3–2 defeat to Cyprus. Óscar Sonejee became the first Andorran player to accumulate 100 caps, reaching the tally on 6 June 2015 in a 1–0 defeat to Equatorial Guinea. He went on to finish his international career with 106 caps, holding the caps record until 2017 when Lima overtook him. Josep Gómes is the most-capped goalkeeper with 90 appearances between 2006 and 2026, surpassing the 78 of Koldo, who was named as his country's "golden player" by the AFF during the UEFA Jubilee Awards in 2004 as Andorra's "single most outstanding player". A year after announcing his retirement, he was appointed manager of the national side.

As of October 2026, 48 players have accumulated 25 caps or more for Andorra at international level, with Lima being the nation's oldest (43 years and 276 days) and Sergi Moreno being the youngest (16 years and 125 days). (Note: 11v11.com credits Emili García with an appearance against Finland in 2004, that would make him the youngest, but the appearance was actually made by Txema Garcia. 11v11.com also lists Moreno's debut as 5 June 2004 against Spain, however he appeared in a friendly on 14 April 2004 against China.)

== List ==
Appearances and goals are composed of FIFA World Cup, UEFA European Championship, UEFA Nations League, and each competition's required qualification matches, as well as numerous international friendly tournaments and matches. Players are listed by number of caps. If the number of caps is equal, the players are then listed alphabetically. Statistics updated following match played on 4 October 2026.

	Key
*	Still active for the national team (Note: Players who are still active for the national team are players who have not retired from international football and are, subsequently, eligible to be called up.)
=	Player is tied for the number of caps
GK	Goalkeeper
DF	Defender
MF	Midfielder
FW	Forward

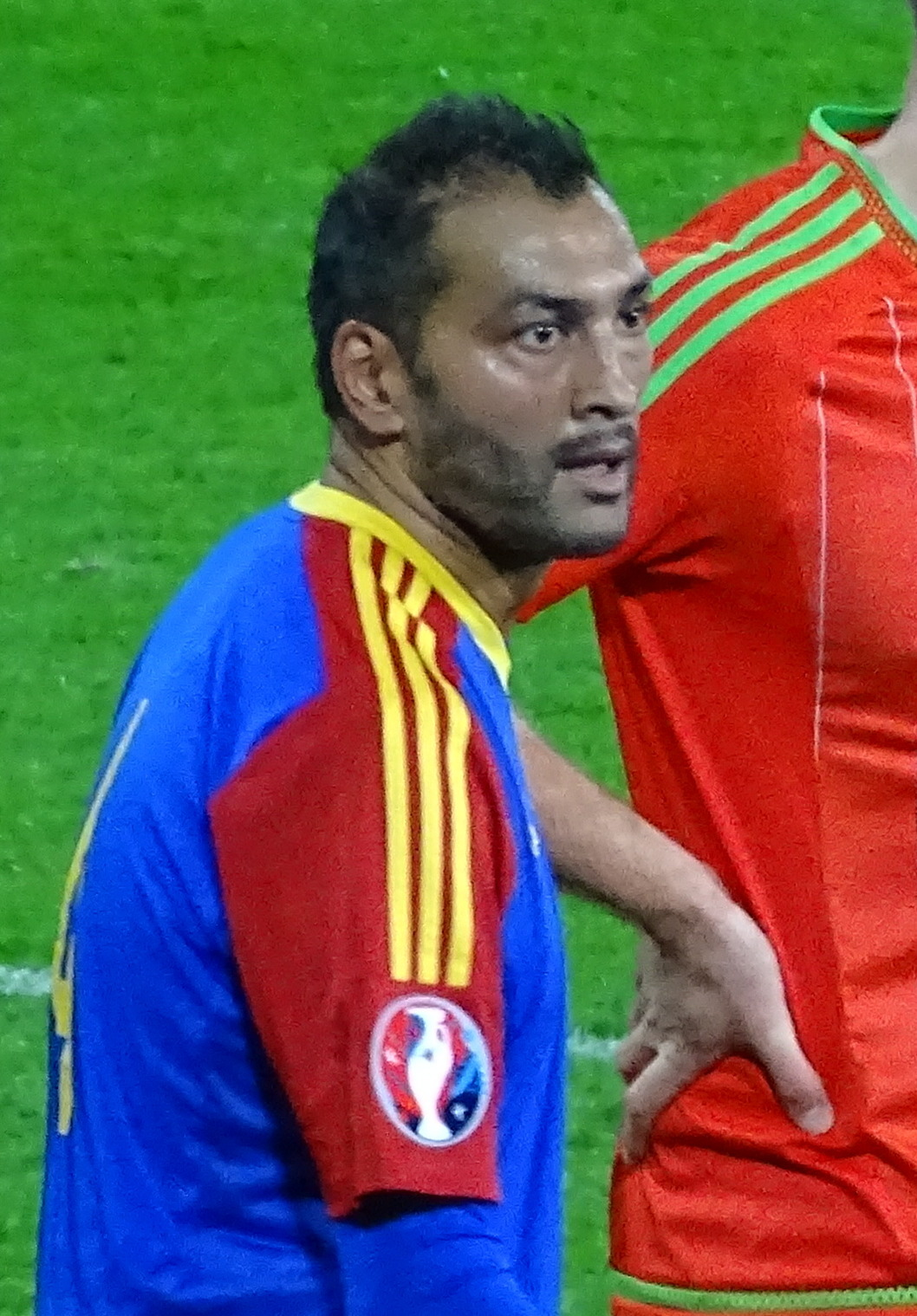
Óscar Sonejee held the all-time appearance record until 2017.

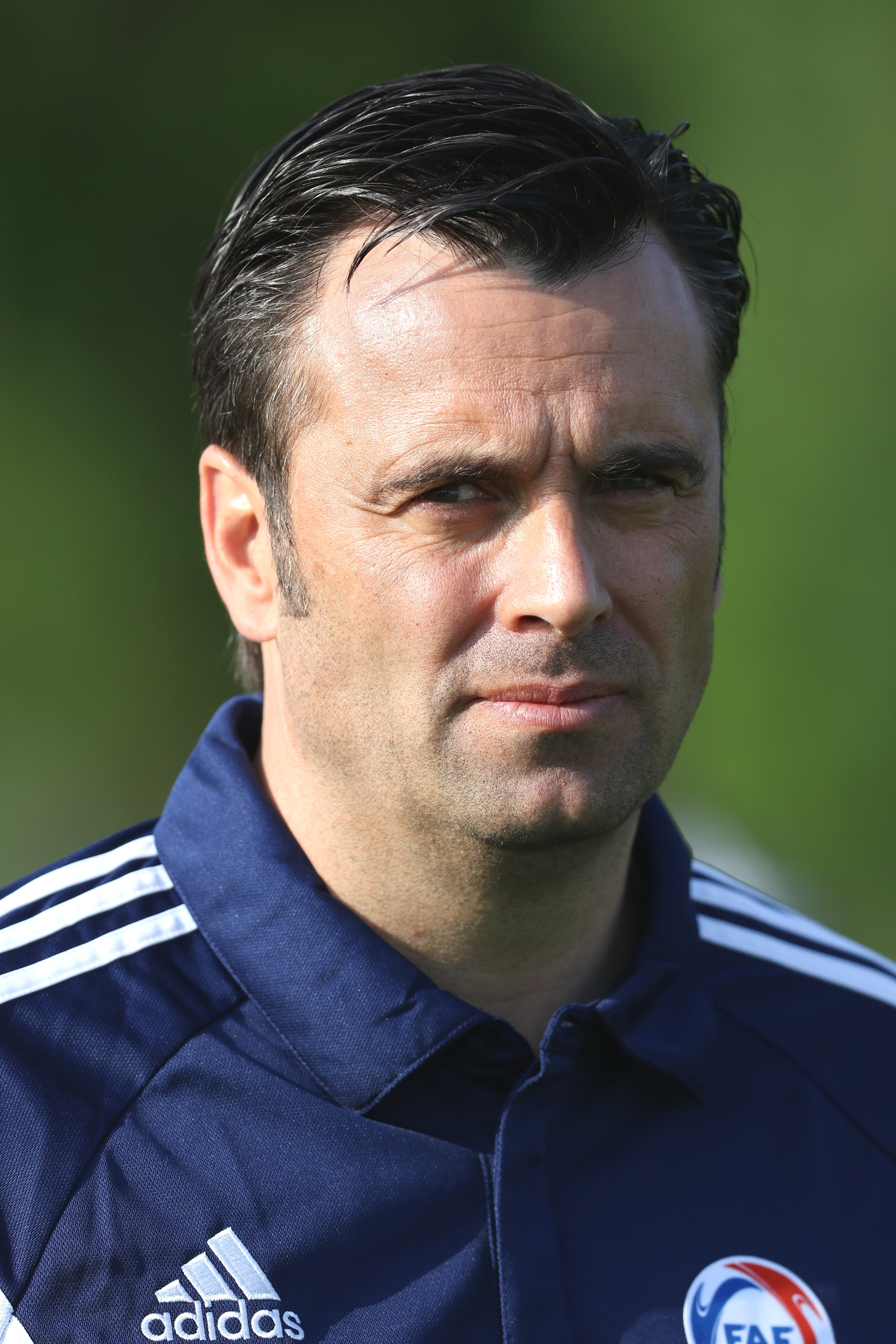
Koldo is the most capped goalkeeper in Andorra's history and has been manager of the side since 2010.

Andorra national team footballers with at least 25 appearances
No.	Name	Position	National team career	Caps	Goals	Notes
1	Ildefons Lima	DF	1997–2023	137	11	
2	Márcio Vieira	MF	2005–2024	129	2	
3	Marc Pujol*	MF	2000–2026	124	5	
4	Marc Vales*	DF	2008–2025	107	5	
5	Óscar Sonejee	MF	1997–2015	106	4	
6	Moisés San Nicolás*	MF	2012–2026	105	1	
7	Max Llovera*	DF	2015–2026	95	1	
8	Josep Gómes	GK	2006–2026	90	0	
9	Josep Ayala	DF	2002–2017	84	1	
10	Marc García*	MF	2010–2026	81	0	
11	Manolo Jiménez Soria	MF	1998–2012	79	1	
12	Koldo Álvarez	GK	1998–2009	78	0	Manager (Note: Koldo is the current manager of the Andorra national team.)
13	Cristian Martínez	MF	2009–2021	77	5	
13	Sergi Moreno	MF	2004–2025	77	1	
15	Juli Sánchez	FW	1996–2019	73	1	
15	Joan Cervós*	DF	2018–2025	73	1	
17	Txema Garcia	DF	1997–2009	71	0	
18	Jordi Aláez	MF	2016–2026	70	4	
19	Marc Rebés*	DF	2015–2025	68	3	
20	Jordi Rubio	DF	2006–2024	67	2	
20	Àlex Martínez*	FW	2016–2026	67	2	
20	Justo Ruiz	MF	1998–2008	67	2	
23	Jordi Escura	MF	1998–2011	65	0	
24	Antoni Lima	DF	1997–2009	64	1	
25	Ricard Fernández*	FW	2018–2026	62	2	
26	Emili García	DF	2008–2021	58	1	
26	Jesús Rubio*	MF	2015–2026	58	1	
28	Fernando Silva	FW	2002–2013	51	2	
29	Ludovic Clemente	MF	2005–2024	47	0	
30	Iker Álvarez*	GK	2021–2026	42	0	
31	Gabi Riera	FW	2004–2017	40	1	
32	Aarón Sánchez	FW	2015–2024	38	0	
33	Genís García	MF	1997–2010	37	0	
33	Emiliano González Arqués	FW	1998–2002	37	2	
35	Juli Fernández	DF	1998–2009	36	1	
36	Christian García*	MF	2020–2026	33	1	
37	Marc Bernaus	DF	2000–2013	32	1	
37	Francesc Ramirez	MF	1997–2004	32	1	
37	Sebastián Gómez	MF	2008–2019	32	0	
40	Albert Rosas	FW	2021–2026	30	5	
40	Roberto Jonas	DF	1999–2005	30	0	
40	Víctor Rodríguez	DF	2008–2019	30	0	
43	Jesús Lucendo	DF	1996–2003	29	3	
44	Iván Lorenzo	MF	2003–2016	28	0	
44	Agusti Pol	MF	1996–2003	28	1	
44	Albert Alavedra	DF	2020–2023	28	0	
47	Ferran Pol	GK	2010–2019	27	0	
48	Xavi Andorrà	FW	2006–2013	25	0	
