= UEFA Euro 2012 qualifying Group B =

Football tournament qualifying stage

This page shows the standings and results for Group B of the UEFA Euro 2012 qualifying tournament.

== Standings ==
Pos	Team	Pld	W	D	L	GF	GA	GD	Pts	Qualification	(Russia)	(Republic of Ireland)	(Armenia)	(Slovakia)	(North Macedonia)	(Andorra)
1	Russia	10	7	2	1	17	4	+13	23	Qualify for final tournament	—	0–0	3–1	0–1	1–0	6–0
2	Republic of Ireland	10	6	3	1	15	7	+8	21	Advance to play-offs	2–3	—	2–1	0–0	2–1	3–1
3	Armenia	10	5	2	3	22	10	+12	17		0–0	0–1	—	3–1	4–1	4–0
4	Slovakia	10	4	3	3	7	10	−3	15		0–1	1–1	0–4	—	1–0	1–0
5	Macedonia	10	2	2	6	8	14	−6	8		0–1	0–2	2–2	1–1	—	1–0
6	Andorra	10	0	0	10	1	25	−24	0		0–2	0–2	0–3	0–1	0–2	—

Source: UEFA
Rules for classification: Qualification tiebreakers

== Matches ==
Group B fixtures were to be negotiated between the participants at a meeting in Moscow, Russia, on 15 and 16 March 2010. After that meeting proved inconclusive, the fixture list was determined by a random draw at the XXXIV Ordinary UEFA Congress in Tel Aviv, Israel, on 25 March.

3 September 2010
20:00 UTC+5

Armenia	0–1	Republic of Ireland
	Report	Fahey 76'

Vazgen Sargsyan Republican Stadium, Yerevan
Attendance: 8,600
Referee: Zsolt Szabó (Hungary)
3 September 2010
18:30 UTC+2

Andorra	0–2	Russia
	Report	Pogrebnyak 14', 64' (pen.)

Estadi Comunal, Andorra la Vella
Attendance: 1,100
Referee: Marco Borg (Malta)
3 September 2010
20:30 UTC+2

Slovakia	1–0	Macedonia
Hološko 90+1'	Report

Štadión Pasienky, Bratislava
Attendance: 5,980
Referee: Claudio Circhetta (Switzerland)

7 September 2010
19:00 UTC+4

Russia	0–1	Slovakia
	Report	Stoch 27'

Lokomotiv Stadium, Moscow
Attendance: 27,052
Referee: Frank De Bleeckere (Belgium)
7 September 2010
20:00 UTC+2

Macedonia	2–2	Armenia
Gjurovski 42'; Naumoski 90+6' (pen.)	Report	Movsisyan 41'; Manucharyan 90+1'

Philip II Arena, Skopje
Attendance: 9,000
Referee: Espen Berntsen (Norway)
7 September 2010
19:45 UTC+1

Republic of Ireland	3–1	Andorra
Kilbane 15'; Doyle 41'; Keane 54'	Report	Martínez 45'

Landsdowne Road, Dublin
Attendance: 40,283
Referee: Leontios Trattou (Cyprus)

8 October 2010
20:00 UTC+5

Armenia	3–1	Slovakia
Movsisyan 23'; Ghazaryan 50'; Mkhitaryan 89'	Report	Weiss 37'

Vazgen Sargsyan Republican Stadium, Yerevan
Attendance: 8,500
Referee: Daniele Orsato (Italy)
8 October 2010
19:00 UTC+2

Andorra	0–2	Macedonia
	Report	Naumoski 42'; Šikov 60'

Estadi Comunal, Andorra la Vella
Attendance: 550
Referee: Gediminas Mažeika (Lithuania)
8 October 2010
19:45 UTC+1

Republic of Ireland	2–3	Russia
Keane 72' (pen.); Long 78'	Report	Kerzhakov 11'; Dzagoev 29'; Shirokov 50'

Landsdowne Road, Dublin
Attendance: 50,411
Referee: Kevin Blom (Netherlands)

12 October 2010
20:00 UTC+5

Armenia	4–0	Andorra
Ghazaryan 4'; Mkhitaryan 16'; Movsisyan 33'; Pizzelli 52'	Report

Vazgen Sargsyan Republican Stadium, Yerevan
Attendance: 11,000
Referee: Tomasz Mikulski (Poland)
12 October 2010
20:30 UTC+2

Macedonia	0–1	Russia
	Report	Kerzhakov 8'

Philip II Arena, Skopje
Attendance: 10,500
Referee: Stefan Johannesson (Sweden)
12 October 2010
20:30 UTC+2

Slovakia	1–1	Republic of Ireland
Ďurica 36'	Report	St Ledger 16'

Stadium Pod Dubňom, Žilina
Attendance: 10,892
Referee: Alberto Undiano Mallenco (Spain)

26 March 2011
19:00 UTC+4

Armenia	0–0	Russia
	Report

Vazgen Sargsyan Republican Stadium, Yerevan
Attendance: 14,400
Referee: Craig Thomson (Scotland)
26 March 2011
20:00 UTC+1

Andorra	0–1	Slovakia
	Report	Šebo 21'

Estadi Comunal, Andorra la Vella
Attendance: 850
Referee: Menashe Masiah (Israel)
26 March 2011
19:45 UTC±0

Republic of Ireland	2–1	Macedonia
McGeady 2'; Keane 21'	Report	Tričkovski 45'

Landsdowne Road, Dublin
Attendance: 33,200
Referee: István Vad (Hungary)

4 June 2011
19:00 UTC+4

Russia	3–1	Armenia
Pavlyuchenko 26', 59', 73' (pen.)	Report	Pizzelli 25'

Petrovsky Stadium, Saint Petersburg
Attendance: 18,000
Referee: Stéphane Lannoy (France)
4 June 2011
20:15 UTC+2

Slovakia	1–0	Andorra
Karhan 63'	Report

Štadión Pasienky, Bratislava
Attendance: 4,300
Referee: Lorenc Jemini (Albania)
4 June 2011
21:30 UTC+2

Macedonia	0–2	Republic of Ireland
	Report	Keane 8', 37'

Philip II Arena, Skopje
Attendance: 29,500
Referee: Florian Meyer (Germany)

2 September 2011
18:00 UTC+2

Andorra	0–3	Armenia
	Report	Pizzelli 35'; Ghazaryan 75'; Mkhitaryan 90+1' (pen.)

Estadi Comunal, Andorra la Vella
Attendance: 750
Referee: Alexander Kostadinov (Bulgaria)
2 September 2011
20:00 UTC+4

Russia	1–0	Macedonia
Semshov 41'	Report

Luzhniki Stadium, Moscow
Attendance: 31,028
Referee: Bülent Yıldırım (Turkey)
2 September 2011
19:45 UTC+1

Republic of Ireland	0–0	Slovakia
	Report

Landsdowne Road, Dublin
Attendance: 35,480
Referee: Pedro Proença (Portugal)

6 September 2011
19:00 UTC+4

Russia	0–0	Republic of Ireland
	Report

Luzhniki Stadium, Moscow
Attendance: 49,515
Referee: Felix Brych (Germany)
6 September 2011
20:00 UTC+2

Macedonia	1–0	Andorra
Ivanovski 59'	Report

Philip II Arena, Skopje
Attendance: 5,000
Referee: Mark Steven Whitby (Wales)
6 September 2011
20:15 UTC+2

Slovakia	0–4	Armenia
	Report	Movsisyan 57'; Mkhitaryan 70'; Ghazaryan 80'; Sarkisov 90+1'

Stadium Pod Dubňom, Žilina
Attendance: 7,238
Referee: Marcin Borski (Poland)

7 October 2011
20:00 UTC+5

Armenia	4–1	Macedonia
Pizzelli 28'; Mkhitaryan 34'; Ghazaryan 69'; Sarkisov 90+1'	Report	Šikov 86'

Vazgen Sargsyan Republican Stadium, Yerevan
Attendance: 14,403
Referee: Robert Schörgenhofer (Austria)
7 October 2011
20:15 UTC+2

Slovakia	0–1	Russia
	Report	Dzagoev 71'

Stadium Pod Dubňom, Žilina
Attendance: 10,087
Referee: Jonas Eriksson (Sweden)
7 October 2011
21:30 UTC+2

Andorra	0–2	Republic of Ireland
	Report	Doyle 8'; McGeady 20'

Estadi Comunal, Andorra la Vella
Attendance: 860
Referee: Libor Kovařik (Czech Republic)

11 October 2011
21:45 UTC+4

Russia	6–0	Andorra
Dzagoev 5', 44'; Ignashevich 26'; Pavlyuchenko 30'; Glushakov 59'; Bilyaletdinov 78'	Report

Luzhniki Stadium, Moscow
Attendance: 38,790
Referee: Eli Hacmon (Israel)
11 October 2011
18:45 UTC+1

Republic of Ireland	2–1	Armenia
V. Aleksanyan 43' (o.g.); Dunne 59'	Report	Mkhitaryan 62'

Landsdowne Road, Dublin
Attendance: 45,200
Referee: Eduardo Iturralde González (Spain)
11 October 2011
19:45 UTC+2

Macedonia	1–1	Slovakia
Noveski 79'	Report	Piroska 54'

Philip II Arena, Skopje
Attendance: 4,100
Referee: Tony Chapron (France)

== Goalscorers ==
There were 70 goals scored in 30 matches, for an average of 2.33 goals per match.

6 goals

- (Armenia national football team) Henrikh Mkhitaryan

5 goals

- (Armenia national football team) Gevorg Ghazaryan
- (Republic of Ireland national football team) Robbie Keane

4 goals

- (Armenia national football team) Yura Movsisyan
- (Armenia national football team) Marcos Pizzelli
- (Russia national football team) Alan Dzagoev
- (Russia national football team) Roman Pavlyuchenko

2 goals

- (Armenia national football team) Artur Sarkisov
- (North Macedonia national football team) Ilčo Naumoski
- (North Macedonia national football team) Vanche Shikov
- (Republic of Ireland national football team) Kevin Doyle
- (Republic of Ireland national football team) Aiden McGeady
- (Russia national football team) Aleksandr Kerzhakov
- (Russia national football team) Pavel Pogrebnyak

1 goal

- (Andorra national football team) Cristian Martínez
- (Armenia national football team) Edgar Manucharyan
- (North Macedonia national football team) Mario Gjurovski
- (North Macedonia national football team) Mirko Ivanovski
- (North Macedonia national football team) Nikolče Noveski
- (North Macedonia national football team) Ivan Trichkovski
- (Republic of Ireland national football team) Richard Dunne
- (Republic of Ireland national football team) Keith Fahey
- (Republic of Ireland national football team) Kevin Kilbane
- (Republic of Ireland national football team) Shane Long
- (Republic of Ireland national football team) Sean St Ledger
- (Russia national football team) Diniyar Bilyaletdinov
- (Russia national football team) Denis Glushakov
- (Russia national football team) Sergei Ignashevich
- (Russia national football team) Igor Semshov
- (Russia national football team) Roman Shirokov
- (Slovakia national football team) Ján Ďurica
- (Slovakia national football team) Filip Hološko
- (Slovakia national football team) Miroslav Karhan
- (Slovakia national football team) Juraj Piroska
- (Slovakia national football team) Filip Šebo
- (Slovakia national football team) Miroslav Stoch
- (Slovakia national football team) Vladimír Weiss

1 own goal

- (Armenia national football team) Valeri Aleksanyan (against Republic of Ireland)

== Discipline ==
Pos	Player	Country	Yellow card	Red card	Suspended for match(es)	Reason
DF	Ildefons Lima	Andorra	4	1	vs Macedonia (8 October 2010) vs Macedonia (6 September 2011)	Booked in 2 UEFA Euro 2012 qualifying matches Sent off in a UEFA Euro 2012 qualifying match
MF	Goran Pandev	Macedonia	3	1	vs Andorra (6 September 2011)	Sent off in a UEFA Euro 2012 qualifying match
MF	Velice Sumulikoski	Macedonia	3	1	vs Slovakia (11 October 2011)	Sent off in a UEFA Euro 2012 qualifying match
FW	Kevin Doyle	Republic of Ireland	3	1	vs Estonia (11 and 15 November 2011)	Sent off in a UEFA Euro 2012 qualifying match
DF	Richard Dunne	Republic of Ireland	4	0	vs Macedonia (3 June 2011) vs Andorra (7 October 2011)	Booked in 2 UEFA Euro 2012 qualifying matches Booked in 2 UEFA Euro 2012 qualifying matches
DF	Aleksandr Anyukov	Russia	4	0	vs Armenia (26 March 2011) vs Andorra (11 October 2011)	Booked in 2 UEFA Euro 2012 qualifying matches Booked in 2 UEFA Euro 2012 qualifying matches
FW	Miroslav Stoch	Slovakia	4	0	vs Andorra (3 June 2011) vs Macedonia (11 October 2011)	Booked in 2 UEFA Euro 2012 qualifying matches Booked in 2 UEFA Euro 2012 qualifying matches
FW	Marc Pujol	Andorra	3	0	vs Macedonia (6 September 2011)	Booked in 2 UEFA Euro 2012 qualifying matches
FW	Fernando Silva	Andorra	3	0	vs Slovakia (26 March 2011)	Booked in 2 UEFA Euro 2012 qualifying matches
DF	Sean St Ledger	Republic of Ireland	3	0	vs Russia (6 September 2011)	Booked in 2 UEFA Euro 2012 qualifying matches
MF	Igor Denisov	Russia	3	0	vs Republic of Ireland (6 September 2011)	Booked in 2 UEFA Euro 2012 qualifying matches
GK	Ján Mucha	Slovakia	3	0	vs Andorra (3 June 2011)	Booked in 2 UEFA Euro 2012 qualifying matches
DF	Martin Škrtel	Slovakia	3	0	vs Republic of Ireland (12 October 2010)	Booked in 2 UEFA Euro 2012 qualifying matches
FW	Xavi Andorrà	Andorra	2	0	vs Armenia (2 September 2011)	Booked in 2 UEFA Euro 2012 qualifying matches
MF	Josep Ayala	Andorra	2	0	vs Russia (11 October 2011)	Booked in 2 UEFA Euro 2012 qualifying matches
DF	Cristian Martínez	Andorra	2	0	vs Russia (11 October 2011)	Booked in 2 UEFA Euro 2012 qualifying matches
FW	Sergi Moreno	Andorra	2	0	vs Slovakia (3 June 2011)	Booked in 2 UEFA Euro 2012 qualifying matches
MF	Marc Vales	Andorra	2	0	vs Republic of Ireland (7 October 2011)	Booked in 2 UEFA Euro 2012 qualifying matches
DF	Karlen Mkrtchyan	Armenia	2	0	vs Andorra (12 October 2010)	Booked in 2 UEFA Euro 2012 qualifying matches
FW	Yura Movsisyan	Armenia	2	0	vs Andorra (2 September 2011)	Booked in 2 UEFA Euro 2012 qualifying matches
MF	Muhamed Demiri	Macedonia	2	0	vs Andorra (6 September 2011)	Booked in 2 UEFA Euro 2012 qualifying matches
FW	Mirko Ivanovski	Macedonia	2	0	vs Slovakia (11 October 2011)	Booked in 2 UEFA Euro 2012 qualifying matches
MF	Nikolče Noveski	Macedonia	2	0	vs Andorra (6 September 2011)	Booked in 2 UEFA Euro 2012 qualifying matches
DF	Goran Popov	Macedonia	2	0	vs Slovakia (11 October 2011)	Booked in 2 UEFA Euro 2012 qualifying matches
DF	Stephen Ward	Republic of Ireland	2	0	vs Armenia (11 October 2011)	Booked in 2 UEFA Euro 2012 qualifying matches
DF	Sergei Ignashevich	Russia	2	0	vs Macedonia (2 September 2011)	Booked in 2 UEFA Euro 2012 qualifying matches
MF	Konstantin Zyryanov	Russia	2	0	vs Andorra (11 October 2011)	Booked in 2 UEFA Euro 2012 qualifying matches
FW	Juraj Kucka	Slovakia	2	0	vs Armenia (6 September 2011)	Booked in 2 UEFA Euro 2012 qualifying matches
FW	Stanislav Šesták	Slovakia	2	0	vs Russia (7 October 2011)	Booked in 2 UEFA Euro 2012 qualifying matches
