= UEFA Euro 2008 qualifying =

Tournament details
- Dates: 16 August 2006 – 24 November 2007
- Teams: 50

Tournament statistics
- Matches played: 306
- Goals scored: 839 (2.74 per match) (Note: The goal tally takes into account the original result of fixtures that were subsequently forfeited, not the awarded scoreline.)
- Top scorer: (Northern Ireland) David Healy (13 goals)

Qualifying for the UEFA Euro 2008 finals tournament took place between August 2006 and November 2007. Fifty teams were divided into seven groups. In a double round-robin system, each team played against each of the others in their group on a home-and-away basis. The winner and runner-up of each group qualified automatically for the final tournament. This was the first Euro qualification since expansion to have no playoff.

Austria and Switzerland qualified automatically as co-hosts of the event.

== Qualified teams ==
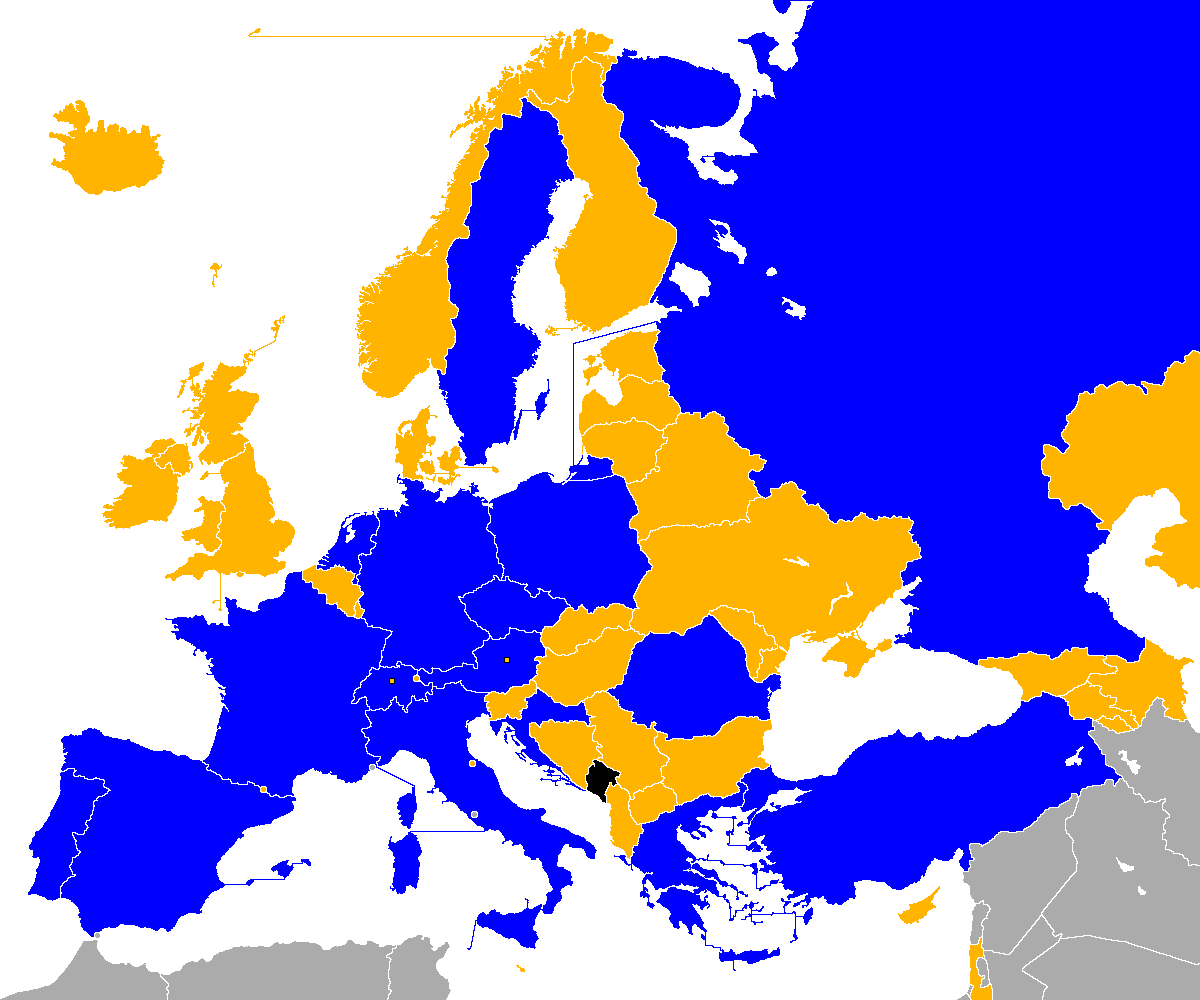
Qualified Did not qualify Did not enter Not a UEFA member

Team	Qualified as	Qualified on	Previous appearances in tournament (Note: Bold indicates champion for that year. Italic indicates host for that year.)
Austria	Co-host	12 December 2002	0 (debut)
Switzerland	Co-host	12 December 2002	2 (1996, 2004)
Germany (Note: From 1972 to 1988, Germany competed as West Germany.)	Group D runner-up	13 October 2007	9 (**1972**, 1976, **1980**, 1984, 1988, 1992, **1996**, 2000, 2004)
Greece	Group C winner	17 October 2007	2 (1980, **2004**)
Czech Republic (Note: From 1960 to 1980, the Czech Republic competed as Czechoslovakia.)	Group D winner	17 October 2007	6 (1960, **1976**, 1980, 1996, 2000, 2004)
Romania	Group G winner	17 October 2007	3 (1984, 1996, 2000)
Poland	Group A winner	17 November 2007	0 (debut)
Italy	Group B winner	17 November 2007	6 (**1968**, 1980, 1988, 1996, 2000, 2004)
France	Group B runner-up	17 November 2007	6 (1960, **1984**, 1992, 1996, **2000**, 2004)
Croatia	Group E winner	17 November 2007	2 (1996, 2004)
Spain	Group F winner	17 November 2007	7 (**1964**, 1980, 1984, 1988, 1996, 2000, 2004)
Netherlands	Group G runner-up	17 November 2007	7 (1976, 1980, **1988**, 1992, 1996, 2000, 2004)
Portugal	Group A runner-up	21 November 2007	4 (1984, 1996, 2000, 2004)
Turkey	Group C runner-up	21 November 2007	2 (1996, 2000)
Russia (Note: From 1960 to 1988, Russia competed as the Soviet Union, and in 1992 as CIS.)	Group E runner-up	21 November 2007	8 (**1960**, 1964, 1968, 1972, 1988, 1992, 1996, 2004)
Sweden	Group F runner-up	21 November 2007	3 (1992, 2000, 2004)

== Seedings ==
UEFA used the 2005 UEFA national team coefficient to rank the teams according to their results in both UEFA Euro 2004 and 2006 FIFA World Cup qualification. Only the group matches counted towards the coefficients. As defending champions, Greece were automatically seeded in the top pool. Since Portugal automatically qualified for UEFA Euro 2004 as hosts, the coefficient factored in only their 2006 FIFA World Cup qualification record. Similarly, Germany's coefficient factored only their UEFA Euro 2004 qualifying record, since they automatically qualified for the 2006 FIFA World Cup as hosts. Meanwhile, Kazakhstan never competed in the European Championships previously, so the coefficient used only their World Cup record. Montenegro had not been admitted to UEFA/FIFA at the time the qualifying competition had started, and thus were ineligible.

The draw took place on 27 January 2006 in Montreux, Switzerland.

Austria (1,333) and Switzerland (1,833) were already assured of places at Euro 2008 as host nations.

Pot 1
Team	Coeff	Rank
Greece (TH)	1,950	13
Netherlands	2,550	1
Portugal	2,500	2
England	2,500	3
Czech Republic	2,450	4
France	2,444	5
Sweden	2,278	6

Pot 2
Team	Coeff	Rank
Germany	2,250	7
Croatia	2,222	8
Italy	2,222	9
Turkey	2,100	10
Poland	2,056	11
Spain	2,056	12
Romania	1,950	14

Pot 3
Team	Coeff	Rank
Serbia and Montenegro	1,889	15
Russia	1,850	16
Denmark	1,850	17
Norway	1,778	18
Bulgaria	1,778	19
Ukraine	1,750	20
Slovakia	1,650	21

Pot 4
Team	Coeff	Rank
Bosnia and Herzegovina	1,611	22
Republic of Ireland	1,556	23
Belgium	1,556	24
Latvia	1,550	25
Israel	1,500	26
Scotland	1,500	27
Slovenia	1,444	28

Pot 5
Team	Coeff	Rank
Hungary	1,389	29
Finland	1,300	30
Estonia	1,250	31
Wales	1,167	32
Lithuania	1,111	33
Albania	0,944	34
Iceland	0,850	35

Pot 6
Team	Coeff	Rank
Georgia	0,850	36
Macedonia	0,750	37
Belarus	0,722	38
Armenia	0,700	39
Northern Ireland	0,667	40
Cyprus	0,667	41
Moldova	0,611	42

Pot 7
Team	Coeff	Rank
Liechtenstein	0,450	43
Azerbaijan	0,389	44
Andorra	0,250	45
Malta	0,222	46
Faroe Islands	0,111	47
Kazakhstan	0,083	48
Luxembourg	0,000	49
San Marino	0,000	50

== Tiebreakers ==
If two or more teams were equal on points on completion of the group matches, the following criteria were applied to determine the rankings:

1. Higher number of points obtained in the group matches played among the teams in question
2. Superior goal difference from the group matches played among the teams in question
3. Higher number of goals scored in the group matches played among the teams in question
4. Higher number of goals scored away from home in the group matches played among the teams in question
5. If, after applying criteria 1) to 4) to several teams, two or more teams still had an equal ranking, the criteria 1) to 4) was reapplied to determine the ranking of these teams. If this procedure did not lead to a decision, criteria 6) and 7) applied;
6. Results of all group matches: 1. Superior goal difference 2. Higher number of goals scored 3. Higher number of goals scored away from home 4. Fair play conduct
7. Drawing of lots

== Summary ==
Group winners and runners-up qualified directly for UEFA Euro 2008
Other teams were eliminated

Group A	Group B	Group C	Group D	Group E	Group F	Group G
Poland Portugal	Italy France	Greece Turkey	Czech Republic Germany	Croatia Russia	Spain Sweden	Romania Netherlands
Serbia Finland Belgium Kazakhstan Armenia Azerbaijan	Scotland Ukraine Lithuania Georgia Faroe Islands	Norway Bosnia and Herzegovina Moldova Hungary Malta	Republic of Ireland Slovakia Wales Cyprus San Marino	England Israel Macedonia Estonia Andorra	Northern Ireland Denmark Latvia Iceland Liechtenstein	Bulgaria Belarus Albania Slovenia Luxembourg

== Groups ==
The qualifying process started in August 2006. Austria and Switzerland were automatically granted places in the tournament finals as the host nations.

The qualifying format had been changed from the previous tournament: the respective winners and runners-up from seven groups would automatically qualify for the finals, alongside the host nations. Therefore, there were no play-offs between the runners-up of the groups. Group A contained eight teams, while the other six groups each contained seven.

As the official successor of the previous football association, Serbia inherited the position originally allotted to Serbia and Montenegro in Group A prior to the dissolution of the state union. Montenegro were granted UEFA membership after qualifying had started and thus were not able to participate in this European Championship.

=== Group A ===
Pos	Team	Pld	W	D	L	GF	GA	GD	Pts	Qualification	(Poland)	(Portugal)	(Serbia)	(Finland)	(Belgium)	(Kazakhstan)	(Armenia)	(Azerbaijan)
1	Poland	14	8	4	2	24	12	+12	28	Qualify for final tournament	—	2–1	1–1	1–3	2–0	3–1	1–0	5–0
2	Portugal	14	7	6	1	24	10	+14	27	Qualify for final tournament	2–2	—	1–1	0–0	4–0	3–0	1–0	3–0
3	Serbia	14	6	6	2	22	11	+11	24 (Note: Head-to-head points: Serbia 4, Finland 1.)		2–2	1–1	—	0–0	1–0	1–0	3–0	1–0
4	Finland	14	6	6	2	13	7	+6	24		0–0	1–1	0–2	—	2–0	2–1	1–0	2–1
5	Belgium	14	5	3	6	14	16	−2	18		0–1	1–2	3–2	0–0	—	0–0	3–0	3–0
6	Kazakhstan	14	2	4	8	11	21	−10	10		0–1	1–2	2–1	0–2	2–2	—	1–2	1–1
7	Armenia	12	2	3	7	4	13	−9	9		1–0	1–1	0–0	0–0	0–1	0–1	—	Canc. (Note: The matches between Azerbaijan and Armenia were cancelled by UEFA with both associations receiving no points, as the two national associations failed to resolve political and security disagreements.)
8	Azerbaijan	12	1	2	9	6	28	−22	5		1–3	0–2	1–6	1–0	0–1	1–1	Canc.	—

Source: UEFA

=== Group B ===
Pos	Team	Pld	W	D	L	GF	GA	GD	Pts	Qualification	(Italy)	(France)	(Scotland)	(Ukraine)	(Lithuania)	(Georgia (country))	(Faroe Islands)
1	Italy	12	9	2	1	22	9	+13	29	Qualify for final tournament	—	0–0	2–0	2–0	1–1	2–0	3–1
2	France	12	8	2	2	25	5	+20	26	Qualify for final tournament	3–1	—	0–1	2–0	2–0	1–0	5–0
3	Scotland	12	8	0	4	21	12	+9	24		1–2	1–0	—	3–1	3–1	2–1	6–0
4	Ukraine	12	5	2	5	18	16	+2	17		1–2	2–2	2–0	—	1–0	3–2	5–0
5	Lithuania	12	5	1	6	11	13	−2	16		0–2	0–1	1–2	2–0	—	1–0	2–1
6	Georgia	12	3	1	8	16	19	−3	10		1–3	0–3	2–0	1–1	0–2	—	3–1
7	Faroe Islands	12	0	0	12	4	43	−39	0		1–2	0–6	0–2	0–2	0–1	0–6	—

Source: UEFA

=== Group C ===
Pos	Team	Pld	W	D	L	GF	GA	GD	Pts	Qualification	(Greece)	(Turkey)	(Norway)	(Bosnia and Herzegovina)	(Moldova)	(Hungary)	(Malta)
1	Greece	12	10	1	1	25	10	+15	31	Qualify for final tournament	—	1–4	1–0	3–2	2–1	2–0	5–0
2	Turkey	12	7	3	2	25	11	+14	24	Qualify for final tournament	0–1	—	2–2	1–0	5–0	3–0	2–0
3	Norway	12	7	2	3	27	11	+16	23		2–2	1–2	—	1–2	2–0	4–0	4–0
4	Bosnia and Herzegovina	12	4	1	7	16	22	−6	13		0–4	3–2	0–2	—	0–1	1–3	1–0
5	Moldova	12	3	3	6	12	19	−7	12 (Note: Tied on head-to-head points (3). Head-to-head goal difference: Moldova +1, Hungary −1.)		0–1	1–1	0–1	2–2	—	3–0	1–1
6	Hungary	12	4	0	8	11	22	−11	12		1–2	0–1	1–4	1–0	2–0	—	2–0
7	Malta	12	1	2	9	10	31	−21	5		0–1	2–2	1–4	2–5	2–3	2–1	—

Source: UEFA

=== Group D ===
Pos	Team	Pld	W	D	L	GF	GA	GD	Pts	Qualification	(Czech Republic)	(Germany)	(Republic of Ireland)	(Slovakia)	(Wales)	(Cyprus)	(San Marino)
1	Czech Republic	12	9	2	1	27	5	+22	29	Qualify for final tournament	—	1–2	1–0	3–1	2–1	1–0	7–0
2	Germany	12	8	3	1	35	7	+28	27	Qualify for final tournament	0–3	—	1–0	2–1	0–0	4–0	6–0
3	Republic of Ireland	12	4	5	3	17	14	+3	17		1–1	0–0	—	1–0	1–0	1–1	5–0
4	Slovakia	12	5	1	6	33	23	+10	16		0–3	1–4	2–2	—	2–5	6–1	7–0
5	Wales	12	4	3	5	18	19	−1	15		0–0	0–2	2–2	1–5	—	3–1	3–0
6	Cyprus	12	4	2	6	17	24	−7	14		0–2	1–1	5–2	1–3	3–1	—	3–0
7	San Marino	12	0	0	12	2	57	−55	0		0–3	0–13	1–2	0–5	1–2	0–1	—

Source: UEFA

=== Group E ===
Pos	Team	Pld	W	D	L	GF	GA	GD	Pts	Qualification	(Croatia)	(Russia)	(England)	(Israel)	(North Macedonia)	(Estonia)	(Andorra)
1	Croatia	12	9	2	1	28	8	+20	29	Qualify for final tournament	—	0–0	2–0	1–0	2–1	2–0	7–0
2	Russia	12	7	3	2	18	7	+11	24	Qualify for final tournament	0–0	—	2–1	1–1	3–0	2–0	4–0
3	England	12	7	2	3	24	7	+17	23 (Note: Head-to-head points: England 4, Israel 1.)		2–3	3–0	—	3–0	0–0	3–0	5–0
4	Israel	12	7	2	3	20	12	+8	23		3–4	2–1	0–0	—	1–0	4–0	4–1
5	North Macedonia	12	4	2	6	12	12	0	14		2–0	0–2	0–1	1–2	—	1–1	3–0
6	Estonia	12	2	1	9	5	21	−16	7		0–1	0–2	0–3	0–1	0–1	—	2–1
7	Andorra	12	0	0	12	2	42	−40	0		0–6	0–1	0–3	0–2	0–3	0–2	—

Source: UEFA

=== Group F ===
Pos	Team	Pld	W	D	L	GF	GA	GD	Pts	Qualification	(Spain)	(Sweden)	(Northern Ireland)	(Denmark)	(Latvia)	(Iceland)	(Liechtenstein)
1	Spain	12	9	1	2	23	8	+15	28	Qualify for final tournament	—	3–0	1–0	2–1	2–0	1–0	4–0
2	Sweden	12	8	2	2	23	9	+14	26	Qualify for final tournament	2–0	—	1–1	0–0	2–1	5–0	3–1
3	Northern Ireland	12	6	2	4	17	14	+3	20 (Note: Head-to-head points: Northern Ireland 4, Denmark 1.)		3–2	2–1	—	2–1	1–0	0–3	3–1
4	Denmark	12	6	2	4	21	11	+10	20		1–3	0–3 (Note: The Denmark v Sweden match was abandoned in the 89th minute at 3–3 following a fan attack on the referee. The match was awarded as a 3–0 forfeit win to Sweden by UEFA following a hearing on 8 June 2007.)	0–0	—	3–1	3–0	4–0
5	Latvia	12	4	0	8	15	17	−2	12		0–2	0–1	1–0	0–2	—	4–0	4–1
6	Iceland	12	2	2	8	10	27	−17	8		1–1	1–2	2–1	0–2	2–4	—	1–1
7	Liechtenstein	12	2	1	9	9	32	−23	7		0–2	0–3	1–4	0–4	1–0	3–0	—

Source: UEFA

=== Group G ===
Pos	Team	Pld	W	D	L	GF	GA	GD	Pts	Qualification	(Romania)	(Netherlands)	(Bulgaria)	(Belarus)	(Albania)	(Slovenia)	(Luxembourg)
1	Romania	12	9	2	1	26	7	+19	29	Qualify for final tournament	—	1–0	2–2	3–1	6–1	2–0	3–0
2	Netherlands	12	8	2	2	15	5	+10	26	Qualify for final tournament	0–0	—	2–0	3–0	2–1	2–0	1–0
3	Bulgaria	12	7	4	1	18	7	+11	25		1–0	1–1	—	2–1	0–0	3–0	3–0
4	Belarus	12	4	1	7	17	23	−6	13		1–3	2–1	0–2	—	2–2	4–2	0–1
5	Albania	12	2	5	5	12	18	−6	11 (Note: Tied on head-to-head results. Overall goal difference was used as the tiebreaker.)		0–2	0–1	1–1	2–4	—	0–0	2–0
6	Slovenia	12	3	2	7	9	16	−7	11		1–2	0–1	0–2	1–0	0–0	—	2–0
7	Luxembourg	12	1	0	11	2	23	−21	3		0–2	0–1	0–1	1–2	0–3	0–3	—

Source: UEFA

== Goalscorers ==
There were 839 goals scored in 306 matches, for an average of 2.74 goals per match.

13 goals

- (Northern Ireland national football team) David Healy

10 goals

- (Croatia national football team) Eduardo

9 goals

- (Poland national football team) Ebi Smolarek

8 goals

- (Denmark national football team) Jon Dahl Tomasson
- (Germany national football team) Lukas Podolski
- (Portugal national football team) Cristiano Ronaldo

7 goals

- (Croatia national football team) Mladen Petrić
- (Norway national football team) Steffen Iversen
- (Serbia national football team) Nikola Žigić
- (Spain national football team) David Villa

6 goals

- (Bulgaria national football team) Dimitar Berbatov
- (Bulgaria national football team) Martin Petrov
- (Czech Republic national football team) Jan Koller
- (France national football team) Thierry Henry
- (Israel national football team) Roberto Colautti
- (Romania national football team) Adrian Mutu
- (Slovakia national football team) Marek Mintál
- (Sweden men's national football team) Marcus Allbäck

5 goals

- (Albania national football team) Edmond Kapllani
- (Cyprus national football team) Ioannis Okkas
- (England national football team) Peter Crouch
- (Georgia national football team) Shota Arveladze
- (Germany national football team) Miroslav Klose
- (Greece national football team) Theofanis Gekas
- (Italy national football team) Luca Toni
- (Kazakhstan national football team) Dmitry Byakov
- (Latvia national football team) Māris Verpakovskis
- (Romania national football team) Ciprian Marica
- (Russia national football team) Aleksandr Kerzhakov
- (Turkey national football team) Hakan Şükür
- (Ukraine national football team) Andriy Shevchenko

4 goals

- (Belarus national football team) Maksim Romaschenko
- (Belgium national football team) Mousa Dembélé
- (Bosnia and Herzegovina national football team) Zvjezdan Misimović
- (Bosnia and Herzegovina national football team) Zlatan Muslimović
- (Denmark national football team) Dennis Rommedahl
- (England national football team) Michael Owen
- (Faroe Islands national football team) Rógvi Jacobsen
- (France national football team) Nicolas Anelka
- (Germany national football team) Thomas Hitzlsperger
- (Hungary national football team) Zoltán Gera
- (Liechtenstein national football team) Mario Frick
- (Lithuania national football team) Tomas Danilevičius
- (Moldova national football team) Viorel Frunză
- (Netherlands national football team) Robin van Persie
- (Norway national football team) John Carew
- (Poland national football team) Jacek Krzynówek
- (Republic of Ireland national football team) Kevin Doyle
- (Republic of Ireland national football team) Stephen Ireland
- (Republic of Ireland national football team) Robbie Keane
- (Romania national football team) Nicolae Dică
- (Scotland national football team) Kris Boyd
- (Scotland national football team) James McFadden
- (Serbia national football team) Danko Lazović
- (Slovenia national football team) Klemen Lavrič
- (Spain national football team) Xavi
- (Sweden men's national football team) Johan Elmander
- (Ukraine national football team) Oleh Husyev
- (Wales national football team) Jason Koumas

3 goals

- (Belarus national football team) Sergei Kornilenko
- (Belarus national football team) Vitali Kutuzov
- (Croatia national football team) Darijo Srna
- (Cyprus national football team) Efstathios Aloneftis
- (Cyprus national football team) Constantinos Charalambidis
- (Czech Republic national football team) Milan Baroš
- (Czech Republic national football team) Libor Sionko
- (England national football team) Steven Gerrard
- (Finland national football team) Jari Litmanen
- (France national football team) Sidney Govou
- (Georgia national football team) Aleksandre Iashvili
- (Georgia national football team) David Siradze
- (Germany national football team) Michael Ballack
- (Germany national football team) Kevin Kurányi
- (Germany national football team) Bastian Schweinsteiger
- (Greece national football team) Angelos Basinas
- (Greece national football team) Angelos Charisteas
- (Greece national football team) Sotirios Kyrgiakos
- (Greece national football team) Nikos Liberopoulos
- (Iceland national football team) Eiður Guðjohnsen
- (Italy national football team) Filippo Inzaghi
- (Latvia national football team) Juris Laizāns
- (North Macedonia national football team) Ilčo Naumoski
- (North Macedonia national football team) Goce Sedloski
- (Malta national football team) Michael Mifsud
- (Malta national football team) André Schembri
- (Moldova national football team) Igor Bugaiov
- (Poland national football team) Radosław Matusiak
- (Portugal national football team) Nuno Gomes
- (Portugal national football team) Simão
- (Russia national football team) Andrey Arshavin
- (Russia national football team) Dmitri Sychev
- (Scotland national football team) Kenny Miller
- (Serbia national football team) Boško Janković
- (Slovakia national football team) Marek Čech
- (Slovakia national football team) Martin Škrtel
- (Spain national football team) Andrés Iniesta
- (Sweden men's national football team) Kim Källström
- (Turkey national football team) Nihat Kahveci
- (Turkey national football team) Tuncay Şanlı
- (Wales national football team) Craig Bellamy

2 goals

- (Albania national football team) Ervin Skela
- (Armenia national football team) Robert Arzumanyan
- (Belarus national football team) Timofei Kalachev
- (Belarus national football team) Uladzimir Karytska
- (Belgium national football team) Karel Geraerts
- (Belgium national football team) Kevin Mirallas
- (Bosnia and Herzegovina national football team) Mirko Hrgović
- (Croatia national football team) Niko Kranjčar
- (Cyprus national football team) Michalis Konstantinou
- (Czech Republic national football team) Marek Jankulovski
- (Czech Republic national football team) Marek Kulič
- (Czech Republic national football team) David Lafata
- (Czech Republic national football team) Tomáš Rosický
- (Denmark national football team) Nicklas Bendtner
- (Denmark national football team) Michael Gravgaard
- (Denmark national football team) Morten Nordstrand
- (England national football team) Jermain Defoe
- (England national football team) Wayne Rooney
- (England national football team) Shaun Wright-Phillips
- (Estonia national football team) Raio Piiroja
- (Finland national football team) Alexei Eremenko
- (Finland national football team) Jonatan Johansson
- (France national football team) Karim Benzema
- (France national football team) Louis Saha
- (France national football team) David Trezeguet
- (Germany national football team) Clemens Fritz
- (Germany national football team) Mario Gómez
- (Greece national football team) Ioannis Amanatidis
- (Greece national football team) Kostas Katsouranis
- (Israel national football team) Elyaniv Barda
- (Israel national football team) Yossi Benayoun
- (Israel national football team) Amit Ben Shushan
- (Israel national football team) Ben Sahar
- (Israel national football team) Toto Tamuz
- (Italy national football team) Antonio Di Natale
- (Italy national football team) Fabio Quagliarella
- (Kazakhstan national football team) Ruslan Baltiev
- (Latvia national football team) Ģirts Karlsons
- (Latvia national football team) Aleksejs Višņakovs
- (Liechtenstein national football team) Thomas Beck
- (Lithuania national football team) Audrius Kšanavičius
- (North Macedonia national football team) Goran Maznov
- (North Macedonia national football team) Goran Pandev
- (Moldova national football team) Serghei Rogaciov
- (Netherlands national football team) Wesley Sneijder
- (Netherlands national football team) Ruud van Nistelrooy
- (Northern Ireland national football team) Kyle Lafferty
- (Norway national football team) Erik Hagen
- (Norway national football team) Morten Gamst Pedersen
- (Norway national football team) John Arne Riise
- (Norway national football team) Ole Gunnar Solskjær
- (Norway national football team) Fredrik Strømstad
- (Portugal national football team) Hugo Almeida
- (Republic of Ireland national football team) Kevin Kilbane
- (Romania national football team) Cosmin Contra
- (Romania national football team) Dorin Goian
- (Romania national football team) Daniel Niculae
- (Romania national football team) Gabriel Tamaș
- (Russia national football team) Vladimir Bystrov
- (Russia national football team) Roman Pavlyuchenko
- (Scotland national football team) Garry O'Connor
- (Serbia national football team) Zdravko Kuzmanović
- (Slovakia national football team) Marek Hamšík
- (Slovakia national football team) Filip Hološko
- (Slovakia national football team) Miroslav Karhan
- (Slovakia national football team) Filip Šebo
- (Slovakia national football team) Stanislav Šesták
- (Slovakia national football team) Róbert Vittek
- (Slovenia national football team) Milivoje Novaković
- (Spain national football team) Sergio Ramos
- (Spain national football team) Fernando Torres
- (Sweden men's national football team) Olof Mellberg
- (Sweden men's national football team) Markus Rosenberg
- (Sweden men's national football team) Anders Svensson
- (Sweden men's national football team) Christian Wilhelmsson
- (Turkey national football team) Halil Altıntop
- (Turkey national football team) Hamit Altıntop
- (Turkey national football team) Tümer Metin
- (Turkey national football team) Gökhan Ünal
- (Ukraine national football team) Maksym Kalynychenko
- (Wales national football team) Gareth Bale
- (Wales national football team) Robert Earnshaw

1 goal

- (Albania national football team) Erjon Bogdani
- (Albania national football team) Debatik Curri
- (Albania national football team) Besnik Hasi
- (Albania national football team) Altin Haxhi
- (Andorra national football team) Juli Fernández
- (Andorra national football team) Fernando Silva
- (Armenia national football team) Sargis Hovsepyan
- (Armenia national football team) Hamlet Mkhitaryan
- (Azerbaijan national football team) Samir Aliyev
- (Azerbaijan national football team) Emin Imamaliev
- (Azerbaijan national football team) André Luiz Ladaga
- (Azerbaijan national football team) Vüqar Nadirov
- (Azerbaijan national football team) Mahmud Qurbanov
- (Azerbaijan national football team) Branimir Subašić
- (Belarus national football team) Vital Bulyga
- (Belarus national football team) Dzyanis Kowba
- (Belarus national football team) Raman Vasilyuk
- (Belgium national football team) Marouane Fellaini
- (Belgium national football team) Luigi Pieroni
- (Belgium national football team) Timmy Simons
- (Belgium national football team) Wesley Sonck
- (Belgium national football team) Daniel Van Buyten
- (Belgium national football team) Kevin Vandenbergh
- (Bosnia and Herzegovina national football team) Sergej Barbarez
- (Bosnia and Herzegovina national football team) Mladen Bartolović
- (Bosnia and Herzegovina national football team) Adnan Čustović
- (Bosnia and Herzegovina national football team) Edin Džeko
- (Bosnia and Herzegovina national football team) Ivica Grlić
- (Bosnia and Herzegovina national football team) Vedad Ibišević
- (Bulgaria national football team) Valeri Bojinov
- (Bulgaria national football team) Velizar Dimitrov
- (Bulgaria national football team) Blagoy Georgiev
- (Bulgaria national football team) Dimitar Telkiyski
- (Bulgaria national football team) Aleksandar Tunchev
- (Bulgaria national football team) Chavdar Yankov
- (Croatia national football team) Boško Balaban
- (Croatia national football team) Ivan Klasnić
- (Croatia national football team) Luka Modrić
- (Croatia national football team) Ivica Olić
- (Croatia national football team) Ivan Rakitić
- (Cyprus national football team) Alexandros Garpozis
- (Cyprus national football team) Constantinos Makrides
- (Cyprus national football team) Stelios Okkarides
- (Cyprus national football team) Yiasoumis Yiasoumi
- (Czech Republic national football team) Zdeněk Grygera
- (Czech Republic national football team) David Jarolím
- (Czech Republic national football team) Radoslav Kováč
- (Czech Republic national football team) Marek Matějovský
- (Czech Republic national football team) Jaroslav Plašil
- (Czech Republic national football team) Jan Polák
- (Czech Republic national football team) Daniel Pudil
- (Denmark national football team) Daniel Agger
- (Denmark national football team) Leon Andreasen
- (Denmark national football team) Daniel Jensen
- (Denmark national football team) Thomas Kahlenberg
- (Denmark national football team) Martin Laursen
- (Denmark national football team) Ulrik Laursen
- (England national football team) Joe Cole
- (England national football team) Rio Ferdinand
- (England national football team) Frank Lampard
- (England national football team) David Nugent
- (England national football team) Micah Richards
- (Estonia national football team) Joel Lindpere
- (Estonia national football team) Andres Oper
- (Estonia national football team) Indrek Zelinski
- (Finland national football team) Mikael Forssell
- (Finland national football team) Sami Hyypiä
- (Finland national football team) Shefki Kuqi
- (Finland national football team) Mika Nurmela
- (Finland national football team) Teemu Tainio
- (Finland national football team) Mika Väyrynen
- (France national football team) Hatem Ben Arfa
- (France national football team) Florent Malouda
- (France national football team) Samir Nasri
- (France national football team) Franck Ribéry
- (France national football team) Jérôme Rothen
- (Georgia national football team) Giorgi Demetradze
- (Georgia national football team) Levan Kobiashvili
- (Georgia national football team) Levan Mchedlidze
- (Georgia national football team) Davit Mujiri
- (Georgia national football team) Giorgi Shashiashvili
- (Germany national football team) Manuel Friedrich
- (Germany national football team) Torsten Frings
- (Germany national football team) Marcell Jansen
- (Germany national football team) Bernd Schneider
- (Greece national football team) Christos Patsatzoglou
- (Greece national football team) Georgios Samaras
- (Greece national football team) Giourkas Seitaridis
- (Hungary national football team) Ákos Buzsáky
- (Hungary national football team) Pál Dárdai
- (Hungary national football team) Róbert Feczesin
- (Hungary national football team) Szabolcs Huszti
- (Hungary national football team) Tamás Priskin
- (Hungary national football team) Sándor Torghelle
- (Hungary national football team) Dániel Tőzsér
- (Iceland national football team) Ármann Smári Björnsson
- (Iceland national football team) Brynjar Gunnarsson
- (Iceland national football team) Emil Hallfreðsson
- (Iceland national football team) Hermann Hreiðarsson
- (Iceland national football team) Gunnar Heiðar Þorvaldsson
- (Iceland national football team) Arnar Viðarsson
- (Israel national football team) Shimon Gershon
- (Israel national football team) Omer Golan
- (Israel national football team) Idan Tal
- (Israel national football team) Barak Yitzhaki
- (Italy national football team) Mauro Camoranesi
- (Italy national football team) Giorgio Chiellini
- (Italy national football team) Daniele De Rossi
- (Italy national football team) Alberto Gilardino
- (Italy national football team) Fabio Grosso
- (Italy national football team) Massimo Oddo
- (Italy national football team) Christian Panucci
- (Italy national football team) Simone Perrotta
- (Italy national football team) Andrea Pirlo
- (Kazakhstan national football team) Kairat Ashirbekov
- (Kazakhstan national football team) Sergei Ostapenko
- (Kazakhstan national football team) Samat Smakov
- (Kazakhstan national football team) Nurbol Zhumaskaliyev
- (Latvia national football team) Kaspars Gorkšs
- (Latvia national football team) Oskars Kļava
- (Liechtenstein national football team) Franz Burgmeier
- (Liechtenstein national football team) Raphael Rohrer
- (Lithuania national football team) Edgaras Jankauskas
- (Lithuania national football team) Darius Miceika
- (Lithuania national football team) Saulius Mikoliūnas
- (Lithuania national football team) Mantas Savėnas
- (Lithuania national football team) Andrius Skerla
- (Luxembourg national football team) Alphonse Leweck
- (Luxembourg national football team) Chris Sagramola
- (North Macedonia national football team) Nikolče Noveski
- (North Macedonia national football team) Aco Stojkov
- (Malta national football team) George Mallia
- (Malta national football team) Jamie Pace
- (Malta national football team) Brian Said
- (Malta national football team) Terence Scerri
- (Moldova national football team) Serghei Alexeev
- (Moldova national football team) Alexandru Epureanu
- (Moldova national football team) Nicolae Josan
- (Netherlands national football team) Klaas-Jan Huntelaar
- (Netherlands national football team) Danny Koevermans
- (Netherlands national football team) Dirk Kuyt
- (Netherlands national football team) Joris Mathijsen
- (Netherlands national football team) Giovanni van Bronckhorst
- (Netherlands national football team) Rafael van der Vaart
- (Northern Ireland national football team) Warren Feeney
- (Northern Ireland national football team) Grant McCann
- (Norway national football team) Martin Andresen
- (Norway national football team) Daniel Braaten
- (Norway national football team) Simen Brenne
- (Norway national football team) Kristofer Hæstad
- (Norway national football team) Thorstein Helstad
- (Norway national football team) Bjørn Helge Riise
- (Poland national football team) Jacek Bąk
- (Poland national football team) Dariusz Dudka
- (Poland national football team) Łukasz Garguła
- (Poland national football team) Przemysław Kaźmierczak
- (Poland national football team) Mariusz Lewandowski
- (Poland national football team) Wojciech Łobodziński
- (Poland national football team) Rafał Murawski
- (Poland national football team) Maciej Żurawski
- (Portugal national football team) Bruno Alves
- (Portugal national football team) Ricardo Carvalho
- (Portugal national football team) Ariza Makukula
- (Portugal national football team) Maniche
- (Portugal national football team) Nani
- (Portugal national football team) Hélder Postiga
- (Portugal national football team) Ricardo Quaresma
- (Portugal national football team) Tiago
- (Republic of Ireland national football team) Richard Dunne
- (Republic of Ireland national football team) Steve Finnan
- (Republic of Ireland national football team) Andy Reid
- (Romania national football team) Bănel Nicoliță
- (Romania national football team) Florentin Petre
- (Romania national football team) Laurențiu Roșu
- (Russia national football team) Vasili Berezutski
- (Russia national football team) Diniyar Bilyaletdinov
- (Russia national football team) Pavel Pogrebnyak
- (San Marino national football team) Manuel Marani
- (San Marino national football team) Andy Selva
- (Scotland national football team) Craig Beattie
- (Scotland national football team) Gary Caldwell
- (Scotland national football team) Christian Dailly
- (Scotland national football team) Barry Ferguson
- (Scotland national football team) Darren Fletcher
- (Scotland national football team) Shaun Maloney
- (Scotland national football team) Lee McCulloch
- (Scotland national football team) Stephen McManus
- (Serbia national football team) Branislav Ivanović
- (Serbia national football team) Milan Jovanović
- (Serbia national football team) Milan Smiljanić
- (Serbia national football team) Dejan Stanković
- (Serbia national football team) Duško Tošić
- (Slovakia national football team) Ján Ďurica
- (Slovakia national football team) Martin Jakubko
- (Slovakia national football team) Maroš Klimpl
- (Slovakia national football team) Ľubomír Michalík
- (Slovakia national football team) Marek Sapara
- (Slovakia national football team) Dušan Švento
- (Slovakia national football team) Stanislav Varga
- (Slovenia national football team) Boštjan Cesar
- (Slovenia national football team) Robert Koren
- (Slovenia national football team) Dare Vršič
- (Spain national football team) Joan Capdevila
- (Spain national football team) Luis García
- (Spain national football team) Fernando Morientes
- (Spain national football team) Albert Riera
- (Spain national football team) Raúl Tamudo
- (Sweden men's national football team) Petter Hansson
- (Sweden men's national football team) Freddie Ljungberg
- (Turkey national football team) Mehmet Aurélio
- (Turkey national football team) Emre Belözoğlu
- (Turkey national football team) Servet Çetin
- (Turkey national football team) Gökdeniz Karadeniz
- (Turkey national football team) Ümit Karan
- (Turkey national football team) Sabri Sarıoğlu
- (Ukraine national football team) Oleksandr Kucher
- (Ukraine national football team) Ruslan Rotan
- (Ukraine national football team) Andriy Rusol
- (Ukraine national football team) Oleh Shelayev
- (Ukraine national football team) Andriy Vorobey
- (Ukraine national football team) Andriy Voronin
- (Ukraine national football team) Volodymyr Yezerskiy
- (Wales national football team) James Collins
- (Wales national football team) Simon Davies
- (Wales national football team) Freddy Eastwood
- (Wales national football team) Ryan Giggs
- (Wales national football team) Joe Ledley

1 own goal

- (Albania national football team) Arjan Beqaj (against Netherlands)
- (Bulgaria national football team) Radostin Kishishev (against Albania)
- (Czech Republic national football team) Martin Jiránek (against Wales)
- (Czech Republic national football team) Michal Kadlec (against Slovakia)
- (England national football team) Gary Neville (against Croatia)
- (Estonia national football team) Taavi Rähn (against England)
- (Faroe Islands national football team) Fróði Benjaminsen (against Italy)
- (Georgia national football team) Malkhaz Asatiani (against France)
- (Germany national football team) Christoph Metzelder (against Slovakia)
- (Hungary national football team) Vilmos Vanczák (against Greece)
- (Kazakhstan national football team) Sergei Ostapenko (against Serbia)
- (Latvia national football team) Dzintars Zirnis (against Liechtenstein)
- (Northern Ireland national football team) Chris Baird (against Latvia)
- (Northern Ireland national football team) Keith Gillespie (against Iceland)

2 own goals

- (Slovakia national football team) Ján Ďurica (against Germany & Wales)
