= UEFA Euro 2008 qualifying Group E =

Football tournament

In Group E of the UEFA Euro 2008 qualifying tournament, Croatia secured qualification to the finals on 17 November 2007 following Israel's 2–1 win against Russia, becoming the seventh team in the whole of the qualification stage to do so. Russia secured qualification to the tournament finals on 21 November 2007 following a 1–0 win against Andorra, and Croatia's 3–2 win against England, becoming the fourteenth and last team in the whole of the qualification stage to do so.

== Standings ==
Pos	Team	Pld	W	D	L	GF	GA	GD	Pts	Qualification	(Croatia)	(Russia)	(England)	(Israel)	(North Macedonia)	(Estonia)	(Andorra)
1	Croatia	12	9	2	1	28	8	+20	29	Qualify for final tournament	—	0–0	2–0	1–0	2–1	2–0	7–0
2	Russia	12	7	3	2	18	7	+11	24	Qualify for final tournament	0–0	—	2–1	1–1	3–0	2–0	4–0
3	England	12	7	2	3	24	7	+17	23 (Note: Head-to-head points: England 4, Israel 1.)		2–3	3–0	—	3–0	0–0	3–0	5–0
4	Israel	12	7	2	3	20	12	+8	23		3–4	2–1	0–0	—	1–0	4–0	4–1
5	Macedonia	12	4	2	6	12	12	0	14		2–0	0–2	0–1	1–2	—	1–1	3–0
6	Estonia	12	2	1	9	5	21	−16	7		0–1	0–2	0–3	0–1	0–1	—	2–1
7	Andorra	12	0	0	12	2	42	−40	0		0–6	0–1	0–3	0–2	0–3	0–2	—

Source: UEFA
Rules for classification: Qualification tiebreakers

== Matches ==
Group E fixtures were negotiated at a meeting between the participants in Nyon, Switzerland, on 3 March 2006.

16 August 2006
18:00 UTC+3

Estonia	0–1	Macedonia
	Report	Sedloski 73'

Lilleküla Stadium, Tallinn
Attendance: 7,500
Referee: Kristinn Jakobsson (Iceland)

2 September 2006
17:00 UTC+1

England	5–0	Andorra
Crouch 5', 66'; Gerrard 13'; Defoe 38', 47'	Report

Old Trafford, Manchester
Attendance: 56,290
Referee: Bernhard Brugger (Austria)
2 September 2006
21:30 UTC+3

Estonia	0–1	Israel
	Report	Colautti 8'

A Le Coq Arena, Tallinn
Attendance: 7,800
Referee: Johan Verbist (Belgium)

6 September 2006
19:00 UTC+4

Russia	0–0	Croatia
	Report

Lokomotiv Stadium, Moscow
Attendance: 27,500
Referee: Manuel Mejuto González (Spain)
6 September 2006
19:00 UTC+2

Israel	4–1	Andorra
Benayoun 9'; Ben-Shushan 11'; Gershon 43' (pen.); Tamuz 69'	Report	Fernandez 84'

Stadion de Goffert, Nijmegen (Netherlands)
Attendance: 400
Referee: Sinisa Zrnic (Bosnia)
6 September 2006
21:00 UTC+2

Macedonia	0–1	England
	Report	Crouch 46'

Skopje City Stadium, Skopje
Attendance: 16,500
Referee: Bertrand Layec (France)

7 October 2006
19:00 UTC+4

Russia	1–1	Israel
Arshavin 5'	Report	Ben-Shushan 84'

Dynamo Stadium, Moscow
Attendance: 22,000
Referee: Florian Meyer (Germany)
7 October 2006
17:00 UTC+1

England	0–0	Macedonia
	Report

Old Trafford, Manchester
Attendance: 72,062
Referee: Markus Merk (Germany)
7 October 2006
20:15 UTC+2

Croatia	7–0	Andorra
Petrić 12', 37', 48', 50'; Klasnić 58'; Balaban 62'; Modrić 83'	Report

Maksimir Stadium, Zagreb
Attendance: 17,618
Referee: Anthony Zammit (Malta)

11 October 2006
15:00 UTC+2

Andorra	0–3	Macedonia
	Report	Pandev 13'; Noveski 16'; Naumoski 31'

Estadi Comunal, Andorra la Vella
Attendance: 300
Referee: Lasha Silagava (Georgia)
11 October 2006
19:00 UTC+4

Russia	2–0	Estonia
Pogrebnyak 78'; Sychev 90'	Report

Petrovsky Stadium, Saint Petersburg
Attendance: 21,517
Referee: Eric Braamhaar (Netherlands)
11 October 2006
20:00 UTC+2

Croatia	2–0	England
Eduardo 61'; G. Neville 68' (o.g.)	Report

Maksimir Stadium, Zagreb
Attendance: 31,991
Referee: Roberto Rosetti (Italy)

15 November 2006
17:00 UTC+1

Macedonia	0–2	Russia
	Report	Bystrov 18'; Arshavin 32'

Skopje City Stadium, Skopje
Attendance: 13,000
Referee: Paul Allaerts (Belgium)
15 November 2006
19:00 UTC+2

Israel	3–4	Croatia
Colautti 8', 89'; Benayoun 68'	Report	Srna 35' (pen.); Eduardo 39', 54', 72'

Ramat Gan Stadium, Ramat Gan
Attendance: 35,000
Referee: Eduardo Iturralde González (Spain)

24 March 2007
20:30 UTC+2

Estonia	0–2	Russia
	Report	Bystrov 66'; Kerzhakov 78'

Lilleküla Stadium, Tallinn
Attendance: 8,202
Referee: Darko Ceferin (Slovenia)
24 March 2007
20:30 UTC+2

Israel	0–0	England
	Report

Ramat Gan Stadium, Ramat Gan
Attendance: 38,000
Referee: Tom Henning Øvrebø (Norway)
24 March 2007
20:15 UTC+1

Croatia	2–1	Macedonia
Srna 58'; Eduardo 88'	Report	Sedloski 36'

Maksimir Stadium, Zagreb
Attendance: 29,969
Referee: Konrad Plautz (Austria)

28 March 2007
20:30 UTC+3

Israel	4–0	Estonia
Tal 19'; Colautti 29'; Sahar 77', 80'	Report

Ramat Gan Stadium, Ramat Gan
Attendance: 23,658
Referee: Cüneyt Çakır (Turkey)
28 March 2007
21:00 UTC+2

Andorra	0–3	England
	Report	Gerrard 54', 76'; Nugent 90+2'

Olímpic Lluís Companys, Barcelona, Spain
Attendance: 12,800
Referee: Bruno Paixão (Portugal)

2 June 2007
21:30 UTC+3

Estonia	0–1	Croatia
	Report	Eduardo 32'

A Le Coq Arena, Tallinn
Attendance: 8,651
Referee: Viktor Kassai (Hungary)
2 June 2007
19:00 UTC+4

Russia	4–0	Andorra
Kerzhakov 8', 16', 49'; Sychev 71'	Report

Petrovsky Stadium, Saint Petersburg
Attendance: 21,520
Referee: Tommy Skjerven (Norway)
2 June 2007
19:30 UTC+2

Macedonia	1–2	Israel
Stojkov 13'	Report	Yitzhaki 11'; Colautti 44'

Skopje City Stadium, Skopje
Attendance: 12,000
Referee: Knut Kircher (Germany)

6 June 2007
18:00 UTC+2

Andorra	0–2	Israel
	Report	Tamuz 37'; Colautti 53'

Estadi Comunal, Andorra la Vella
Attendance: 618
Referee: Ian Stokes (Ireland)
6 June 2007
20:30 UTC+2

Croatia	0–0	Russia
	Report

Maksimir Stadium, Zagreb
Attendance: 36,194
Referee: Ľuboš Micheľ (Slovakia)
6 June 2007
21:30 UTC+3

Estonia	0–3	England
	Report	J. Cole 37'; Crouch 54'; Owen 62'

A Le Coq Arena, Tallinn
Attendance: 9,635
Referee: Grzegorz Gilewski (Poland)

22 August 2007
19:00 UTC+3

Estonia	2–1	Andorra
Piiroja 34'; Zelinski 90+2'	Report	Silva 87'

A Le Coq Arena, Tallinn
Attendance: 7,500
Referee: Adrian McCourt (Northern Ireland)

8 September 2007
19:00 UTC+4

Russia	3–0	Macedonia
V. Berezutski 8'; Arshavin 84'; Kerzhakov 88'	Report

Lokomotiv Stadium, Moscow
Attendance: 23,000
Referee: Tom Henning Øvrebø (Norway)
8 September 2007
17:00 UTC+1

England	3–0	Israel
Wright-Phillips 20'; Owen 49'; Richards 66'	Report

Wembley Stadium, London
Attendance: 85,372
Referee: Pieter Vink (Netherlands)
8 September 2007
20:30 UTC+2

Croatia	2–0	Estonia
Eduardo 39', 45+1'	Report

Maksimir Stadium, Zagreb
Attendance: 15,102
Referee: Jérôme Laperriere (Switzerland)

12 September 2007
18:00 UTC+2

Andorra	0–6	Croatia
	Report	Srna 34'; Petrić 38', 44'; Kranjčar 49'; Eduardo 55'; Rakitić 64'

Estadi Comunal, Andorra la Vella
Attendance: 925
Referee: Olivier Thual (France)
12 September 2007
20:30 UTC+2

Macedonia	1–1	Estonia
Maznov 30'	Report	Piiroja 17'

Skopje City Stadium, Skopje
Attendance: 5,000
Referee: Leontios Trattou (Cyprus)
12 September 2007
20:00 UTC+1

England	3–0	Russia
Owen 7', 31'; Ferdinand 84'	Report

Wembley Stadium, London
Attendance: 86,106
Referee: Martin Hansson (Sweden)

13 October 2007
15:00 UTC+1

England	3–0	Estonia
Wright-Phillips 11'; Rooney 32'; Rähn 33' (o.g.)	Report

Wembley Stadium, London
Attendance: 86,665
Referee: Nicolai Vollquartz (Denmark)
13 October 2007
20:15 UTC+2

Croatia	1–0	Israel
Eduardo 52'	Report

Maksimir Stadium, Zagreb
Attendance: 30,084
Referee: Wolfgang Stark (Germany)

17 October 2007
19:00 UTC+4

Russia	2–1	England
Pavlyuchenko 69' (pen.), 73'	Report	Rooney 29'

Luzhniki Stadium, Moscow
Attendance: 78,000
Referee: Luis Medina Cantalejo (Spain)
17 October 2007
20:00 UTC+2

Macedonia	3–0	Andorra
Naumoski 30'; Sedloski 44'; Pandev 59'	Report

Skopje City Stadium, Skopje
Attendance: 17,500
Referee: Paulius Malzinskas (Lithuania)

17 November 2007
18:00 UTC+1

Andorra	0–2	Estonia
	Report	Oper 31'; Lindpere 60'

Estadi Comunal, Andorra la Vella
Attendance: 700
Referee: William Collum (Scotland)
17 November 2007
20:00 UTC+2

Israel	2–1	Russia
Barda 10'; Golan 90+2'	Report	Bilyaletdinov 61'

Ramat Gan Stadium, Ramat Gan
Attendance: 27,563
Referee: Stefano Farina (Italy)
17 November 2007
20:00 UTC+1

Macedonia	2–0	Croatia
Maznov 71'; Naumoski 83'	Report

Skopje City Stadium, Skopje
Attendance: 14,500
Referee: Frank De Bleeckere (Belgium)

21 November 2007
19:00 UTC+2

Israel	1–0	Macedonia
Barda 35'	Report

Ramat Gan Stadium, Ramat Gan
Attendance: 2,736
Referee: Tomasz Mikulski (Poland)
21 November 2007
21:00 UTC+1

Andorra	0–1	Russia
	Report	Sychev 38'

Estadi Comunal, Andorra la Vella
Attendance: 780
Referee: Terje Hauge (Norway)
21 November 2007
20:00 UTC+0

England	2–3	Croatia
Lampard 56' (pen.); Crouch 65'	Report	Kranjčar 8'; Olić 14'; Petrić 77'

Wembley Stadium, London
Attendance: 88,091
Referee: Peter Fröjdfeldt (Sweden)

== Goalscorers ==
There were 109 goals scored in 42 matches, for an average of 2.6 goals per match.

10 goals

- (Croatia) Eduardo

7 goals

- (Croatia) Mladen Petrić

6 goals

- (Israel) Roberto Colautti

5 goals

- (England) Peter Crouch
- (Russia) Aleksandr Kerzhakov

4 goals

- (England) Michael Owen

3 goals

- (Croatia) Darijo Srna
- (England) Steven Gerrard
- (North Macedonia) Ilčo Naumoski
- (North Macedonia) Goce Sedloski
- (Russia) Andrey Arshavin
- (Russia) Dmitri Sychev

2 goals

- (Croatia) Niko Kranjčar
- (England) Jermain Defoe
- (England) Wayne Rooney
- (England) Shaun Wright-Phillips
- (Estonia) Raio Piiroja
- (Israel) Elyaniv Barda
- (Israel) Yossi Benayoun
- (Israel) Amit Ben Shushan
- (Israel) Ben Sahar
- (Israel) Toto Tamuz
- (North Macedonia) Goran Maznov
- (North Macedonia) Goran Pandev
- (Russia) Vladimir Bystrov
- (Russia) Roman Pavlyuchenko

1 goal

- (Andorra) Juli Fernández
- (Andorra) Fernando Silva
- (Croatia) Boško Balaban
- (Croatia) Ivan Klasnić
- (Croatia) Luka Modrić
- (Croatia) Ivica Olić
- (Croatia) Ivan Rakitić
- (England) Joe Cole
- (England) Rio Ferdinand
- (England) Frank Lampard
- (England) David Nugent
- (England) Micah Richards
- (Estonia) Joel Lindpere
- (Estonia) Andres Oper
- (Estonia) Indrek Zelinski
- (Israel) Shimon Gershon
- (Israel) Omer Golan
- (Israel) Idan Tal
- (Israel) Barak Yitzhaki
- (North Macedonia) Nikolče Noveski
- (North Macedonia) Aco Stojkov
- (Russia) Vasili Berezutski
- (Russia) Diniyar Bilyaletdinov
- (Russia) Pavel Pogrebnyak

1 own goal

- (England) Gary Neville (against Croatia)
- (Estonia) Taavi Rähn (against England)
