= UEFA Euro 2008 qualifying Group D =

Standings and results for Group D of the UEFA Euro 2008 qualifying tournament.

Germany secured qualification to the tournament proper on 13 October 2007 following a 0–0 draw against the Republic of Ireland, becoming the first team in the whole of the qualification stage to do so. Czech Republic secured qualification to the tournament proper on 17 October 2007 following a 3–0 win against Germany, becoming the third team in the whole of the qualification stage to do so.

== Standings ==
Pos	Team	Pld	W	D	L	GF	GA	GD	Pts	Qualification	(Czech Republic)	(Germany)	(Republic of Ireland)	(Slovakia)	(Wales)	(Cyprus)	(San Marino)
1	Czech Republic	12	9	2	1	27	5	+22	29	Qualify for final tournament	—	1–2	1–0	3–1	2–1	1–0	7–0
2	Germany	12	8	3	1	35	7	+28	27	Qualify for final tournament	0–3	—	1–0	2–1	0–0	4–0	6–0
3	Republic of Ireland	12	4	5	3	17	14	+3	17		1–1	0–0	—	1–0	1–0	1–1	5–0
4	Slovakia	12	5	1	6	33	23	+10	16		0–3	1–4	2–2	—	2–5	6–1	7–0
5	Wales	12	4	3	5	18	19	−1	15		0–0	0–2	2–2	1–5	—	3–1	3–0
6	Cyprus	12	4	2	6	17	24	−7	14		0–2	1–1	5–2	1–3	3–1	—	3–0
7	San Marino	12	0	0	12	2	57	−55	0		0–3	0–13	1–2	0–5	1–2	0–1	—

Source: UEFA
Rules for classification: Qualification tiebreakers

== Matches ==
Group D fixtures were negotiated at a meeting between the participants in Frankfurt, Germany on 9 February 2006.

2 September 2006
20:15 UTC+2

Czech Republic	2–1	Wales
Lafata 76', 89'	Report	Jiránek 85' (o.g.)

Na Stínadlech, Teplice
Attendance: 16,204
Referee: Jonas Eriksson (Sweden)
2 September 2006
20:15 UTC+2

Slovakia	6–1	Cyprus
Škrtel 9'; Mintál 33', 55'; Šebo 43', 48'; Karhan 52'	Report	Yiasoumi 90'

Tehelné pole, Bratislava
Attendance: 4,783
Referee: Oleh Orekhov (Ukraine)
2 September 2006
20:45 UTC+2

Germany	1–0	Republic of Ireland
Podolski 57'	Report

Gottlieb-Daimler-Stadion, Stuttgart
Attendance: 53,198
Referee: Luis Medina Cantalejo (Spain)

6 September 2006
20:15 UTC+2

Slovakia	0–3	Czech Republic
	Report	Sionko 10', 21'; Koller 57'

Tehelné pole, Bratislava
Attendance: 27,683
Referee: Steve Bennett (England)
6 September 2006
20:45 UTC+2

San Marino	0–13	Germany
	Report	Podolski 12', 43', 62', 70'; Schweinsteiger 28', 47'; Klose 29', 44'; Ballack 34'; Hitzlsperger 65', 72'; M. Friedrich 88'; Schneider 89' (pen.)

Stadio Olimpico, Serravalle
Attendance: 5,019
Referee: Selçuk Dereli (Turkey)

7 October 2006
15:00 UTC+1

Wales	1–5	Slovakia
Bale 37'	Report	Švento 14'; Mintál 32', 39'; Karhan 51'; Vittek 59'

Millennium Stadium, Cardiff
Attendance: 28,493
Referee: Dick van Egmond (Netherlands)
7 October 2006
17:15 UTC+2

Czech Republic	7–0	San Marino
Kulič 15'; Polák 22'; Baroš 32', 68'; Koller 42', 52'; Jarolím 49'	Report

U Nisy Stadion, Liberec
Attendance: 9,514
Referee: Vusal Aliyev (Azerbaijan)
7 October 2006
17:30 UTC+3

Cyprus	5–2	Republic of Ireland
Konstantinou 9', 50' (pen.); Garpozis 15'; Charalambides 59', 84'	Report	Ireland 7'; Dunne 43'

Neo GSP Stadium, Nicosia
Attendance: 7,000
Referee: Lucilio Batista (Portugal)

11 October 2006
19:30 UTC+1

Republic of Ireland	1–1	Czech Republic
Kilbane 62'	Report	Koller 63'

Lansdowne Road, Dublin
Attendance: 35,500
Referee: Bertrand Layec (France)
11 October 2006
20:45 UTC+2

Slovakia	1–4	Germany
Varga 58'	Report	Podolski 13', 72'; Ballack 25'; Schweinsteiger 36'

Tehelné Pole, Bratislava
Attendance: 21,582
Referee: Terje Hauge (Norway)
11 October 2006
20:00 UTC+1

Wales	3–1	Cyprus
Koumas 33'; Earnshaw 38'; Bellamy 72'	Report	Okkas 83'

Millennium Stadium, Cardiff
Attendance: 20,456
Referee: Jacek Granat (Poland)

15 November 2006
21:00 UTC+2

Cyprus	1–1	Germany
Okkas 43'	Report	Ballack 16'

Neo GSP Stadium, Nicosia
Attendance: 12,300
Referee: Peter Fröjdfeldt (Sweden)
15 November 2006
19:30 UTC+0

Republic of Ireland	5–0	San Marino
Reid 6'; Doyle 24'; Keane 31', 57' (pen.), 85'	Report

Lansdowne Road, Dublin
Attendance: 34,018
Referee: Lassin Isaksen (Faroe Islands)

7 February 2007
20:45 UTC+1

San Marino	1–2	Republic of Ireland
Marani 86'	Report	Kilbane 49'; Ireland 90+4'

Stadio Olimpico, Serravalle
Attendance: 3,294
Referee: Peter Rasmussen (Denmark)

24 March 2007
15:00 UTC+0

Republic of Ireland	1–0	Wales
Ireland 39'	Report

Croke Park, Dublin
Attendance: 72,539
Referee: Terje Hauge (Norway)
24 March 2007
20:00 UTC+2

Cyprus	1–3	Slovakia
Aloneftis 45'	Report	Vittek 54'; Škrtel 67'; Jakubko 77'

Neo GSP Stadium, Nicosia
Attendance: 2,696
Referee: Gerald Lehner (Austria)
24 March 2007
20:45 UTC+1

Czech Republic	1–2	Germany
Baroš 77'	Report	Kurányi 42', 62'

Toyota Arena, Prague
Attendance: 17,821
Referee: Roberto Rosetti (Italy)

28 March 2007
17:25 UTC+2

Czech Republic	1–0	Cyprus
Kováč 22'	Report

U Nisy, Liberec
Attendance: 9,310
Referee: Ivan Bebek (Croatia)
28 March 2007
19:45 UTC+1

Republic of Ireland	1–0	Slovakia
Doyle 12'	Report

Croke Park, Dublin
Attendance: 71,297
Referee: Yuri Baskakov (Russia)
28 March 2007
20:00 UTC+1

Wales	3–0	San Marino
Giggs 3'; Bale 20'; Koumas 63' (pen.)	Report

Millennium Stadium, Cardiff
Attendance: 18,752
Referee: Ararat Tshagharyan (Armenia)

2 June 2007
15:00 UTC+1

Wales	0–0	Czech Republic
	Report

Millennium Stadium, Cardiff
Attendance: 30,714
Referee: Paul Allaerts (Belgium)
2 June 2007
19:00 UTC+2

Germany	6–0	San Marino
Kurányi 45'; Jansen 52'; Frings 56' (pen.); Gómez 63', 65'; Fritz 67'	Report

Frankenstadion, Nuremberg
Attendance: 43,967
Referee: Jouni Hyytiä (Finland)

6 June 2007
20:30 UTC+2

Germany	2–1	Slovakia
Ďurica 10' (o.g.); Hitzlsperger 43'	Report	Metzelder 20' (o.g.)

AOL Arena, Hamburg
Attendance: 51,600
Referee: Olegário Benquerença (Portugal)

22 August 2007
21:00 UTC+2

San Marino	0–1	Cyprus
	Report	Okkas 54'

Stadio Olimpico, Serravalle
Attendance: 552
Referee: Albano Janku (Albania)

8 September 2007
20:15 UTC+2

San Marino	0–3	Czech Republic
	Report	Rosický 33'; Jankulovski 75'; Koller 90+3'

Stadio Olimpico, Serravalle
Attendance: 3,412
Referee: Dejan Filipović (Serbia)
8 September 2007
20:30 UTC+2

Slovakia	2–2	Republic of Ireland
Klimpl 37'; Čech 90+1'	Report	Ireland 7'; Doyle 57'

Tehelné pole, Bratislava
Attendance: 12,360
Referee: Stefano Farina (Italy)
8 September 2007
19:30 UTC+1

Wales	0–2	Germany
	Report	Klose 6', 60'

Millennium Stadium, Cardiff
Attendance: 27,889
Referee: Manuel Mejuto González (Spain)

12 September 2007
18:30 UTC+2

Slovakia	2–5	Wales
Mintál 12', 57'	Report	Eastwood 22'; Bellamy 34', 41'; Ďurica 78' (o.g.); S. Davies 90'

Štadión Antona Malatinského, Trnava
Attendance: 5,486
Referee: Laurent Duhamel (France)
12 September 2007
20:00 UTC+3

Cyprus	3–0	San Marino
Makridis 15'; Aloneftis 41', 90+2'	Report

Neo GSP Stadium, Nicosia
Attendance: 600
Referee: Alexey Kulbakov (Belarus)
12 September 2007
20:30 UTC+2

Czech Republic	1–0	Republic of Ireland
Jankulovski 15'	Report

AXA Arena, Prague
Attendance: 16,648
Referee: Kyros Vassaras (Greece)

13 October 2007
15:00 UTC+2

Slovakia	7–0	San Marino
Hamšík 24'; Šesták 32', 57'; Sapara 37'; Škrtel 51'; Hološko 54'; Ďurica 76' (pen.)	Report

Mestský štadión, Dubnica nad Váhom
Attendance: 2,576
Referee: Luc Wilmes (Luxembourg)
13 October 2007
19:15 UTC+3

Cyprus	3–1	Wales
Okkas 59', 68'; Charalampidis 79'	Report	Collins 21'

Neo GSP Stadium, Nicosia
Attendance: 3,862
Referee: Carlo Bertolini (Switzerland)
13 October 2007
19:45 UTC+1

Republic of Ireland	0–0	Germany
	Report

Croke Park, Dublin
Attendance: 67,495
Referee: Martin Hansson (Sweden)

17 October 2007
20:15 UTC+2

San Marino	1–2	Wales
Selva 73'	Report	Earnshaw 13'; Ledley 36'

Stadio Olimpico, Serravalle
Attendance: 1,182
Referee: Anthony Zammit (Malta)
17 October 2007
19:30 UTC+1

Republic of Ireland	1–1	Cyprus
Finnan 90+2'	Report	Okkarides 80'

Croke Park, Dublin
Attendance: 54,861
Referee: Mikko Vuorela (Finland)
17 October 2007
20:45 UTC+2

Germany	0–3	Czech Republic
	Report	Sionko 2'; Matějovský 23'; Plašil 63'

Allianz Arena, Munich
Attendance: 66,445
Referee: Howard Webb (England)

17 November 2007
15:00 UTC+0

Wales	2–2	Republic of Ireland
Koumas 23', 89' (pen.)	Report	Keane 31'; Doyle 60'

Millennium Stadium, Cardiff
Attendance: 24,619
Referee: Oleh Oriekhov (Ukraine)
17 November 2007
20:00 UTC+1

Germany	4–0	Cyprus
Fritz 2'; Klose 20'; Podolski 53'; Hitzlsperger 82'	Report

AWD-Arena, Hanover
Attendance: 45,016
Referee: Peter Rasmussen (Denmark)
17 November 2007
20:30 UTC+1

Czech Republic	3–1	Slovakia
Grygera 13'; Kulič 76'; Rosický 83'	Report	Kadlec 79' (o.g.)

AXA Arena, Prague
Attendance: 15,681
Referee: Tony Asumaa (Finland)

21 November 2007
18:30 UTC+2

Cyprus	0–2	Czech Republic
	Report	Pudil 11'; Koller 74'

Neo GSP Stadium, Nicosia
Attendance: 5,866
Referee: Levan Paniashvili (Georgia)
21 November 2007
20:30 UTC+1

Germany	0–0	Wales
	Report

Commerzbank-Arena, Frankfurt
Attendance: 49,252
Referee: Cristian Balaj (Romania)
21 November 2007
20:30 UTC+1

San Marino	0–5	Slovakia
	Report	Michalík 42'; Hološko 51', 57'; Hamšík 53'; Čech 83'

Stadio Olimpico, Serravalle
Attendance: 538
Referee: Andrejs Sipailo (Latvia)

== Goalscorers ==
There were 149 goals scored in 42 matches, for an average of 3.55 goals per match.

8 goals

- (Germany national football team) Lukas Podolski

6 goals

- (Czech Republic national football team) Jan Koller
- (Slovakia national football team) Marek Mintál

5 goals

- (Cyprus national football team) Ioannis Okkas
- (Germany national football team) Miroslav Klose

4 goals

- (Germany national football team) Thomas Hitzlsperger
- (Republic of Ireland national football team) Kevin Doyle
- (Republic of Ireland national football team) Stephen Ireland
- (Republic of Ireland national football team) Robbie Keane
- (Wales national football team) Jason Koumas

3 goals

- (Cyprus national football team) Efstathios Aloneftis
- (Cyprus national football team) Constantinos Charalambidis
- (Czech Republic national football team) Milan Baroš
- (Czech Republic national football team) Libor Sionko
- (Germany national football team) Michael Ballack
- (Germany national football team) Kevin Kurányi
- (Germany national football team) Bastian Schweinsteiger
- (Slovakia national football team) Marek Čech
- (Slovakia national football team) Martin Škrtel
- (Wales national football team) Craig Bellamy

2 goals

- (Cyprus national football team) Michalis Konstantinou
- (Czech Republic national football team) Marek Jankulovski
- (Czech Republic national football team) Marek Kulič
- (Czech Republic national football team) David Lafata
- (Czech Republic national football team) Tomáš Rosický
- (Germany national football team) Clemens Fritz
- (Germany national football team) Mario Gómez
- (Republic of Ireland national football team) Kevin Kilbane
- (Slovakia national football team) Marek Hamšík
- (Slovakia national football team) Filip Hološko
- (Slovakia national football team) Miroslav Karhan
- (Slovakia national football team) Filip Šebo
- (Slovakia national football team) Stanislav Šesták
- (Slovakia national football team) Róbert Vittek
- (Wales national football team) Gareth Bale
- (Wales national football team) Robert Earnshaw

1 goal

- (Cyprus national football team) Alexandros Garpozis
- (Cyprus national football team) Constantinos Makrides
- (Cyprus national football team) Stelios Okkarides
- (Cyprus national football team) Yiasoumis Yiasoumi
- (Czech Republic national football team) Zdeněk Grygera
- (Czech Republic national football team) David Jarolím
- (Czech Republic national football team) Radoslav Kováč
- (Czech Republic national football team) Marek Matějovský
- (Czech Republic national football team) Jaroslav Plašil
- (Czech Republic national football team) Jan Polák
- (Czech Republic national football team) Daniel Pudil
- (Germany national football team) Manuel Friedrich
- (Germany national football team) Torsten Frings
- (Germany national football team) Marcell Jansen
- (Germany national football team) Bernd Schneider
- (Republic of Ireland national football team) Richard Dunne
- (Republic of Ireland national football team) Steve Finnan
- (Republic of Ireland national football team) Andy Reid
- (San Marino national football team) Manuel Marani
- (San Marino national football team) Andy Selva
- (Slovakia national football team) Ján Ďurica
- (Slovakia national football team) Martin Jakubko
- (Slovakia national football team) Maroš Klimpl
- (Slovakia national football team) Ľubomír Michalík
- (Slovakia national football team) Marek Sapara
- (Slovakia national football team) Dušan Švento
- (Slovakia national football team) Stanislav Varga
- (Wales national football team) James Collins
- (Wales national football team) Simon Davies
- (Wales national football team) Freddy Eastwood
- (Wales national football team) Ryan Giggs
- (Wales national football team) Joe Ledley

1 own goal

- (Czech Republic national football team) Martin Jiránek (against Wales)
- (Czech Republic national football team) Michal Kadlec (against Slovakia)
- (Germany national football team) Christoph Metzelder (against Slovakia)

2 own goals

- (Slovakia national football team) Ján Ďurica (against Germany & Wales)
