= Marc Pujol =

Andorran footballer

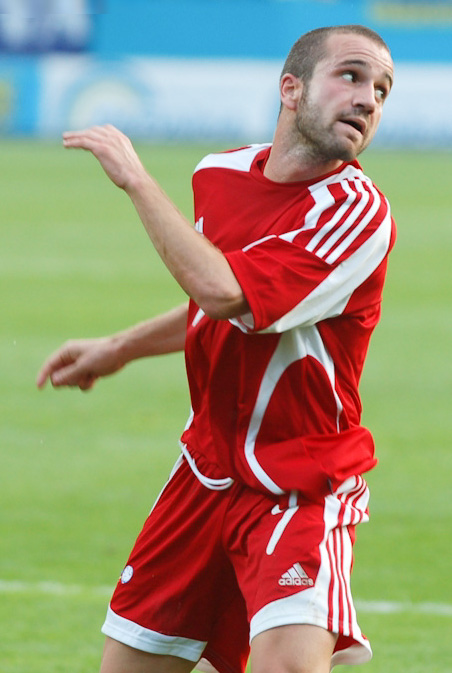
- Pujol during a match against Ukraine in 2009

Personal information
- Full name: Marc Pujol Pons
- Date of birth: 21 August 1982 (age 44)
- Place of birth: Andorra la Vella, Andorra
- Height: 1.68 m (5 ft 6 in)
- Position: Midfielder

Senior career*
Years	Team	Apps	(Gls)
2000–2002	FC Andorra	22	(0)
2002–2004	Sant Andreu	49	(3)
2004	Peña Deportiva		
2004–2005	Figueres	26	(5)
2005–2007	Santboià		
2007–2008	Manresa	17	(0)
2008–2010	Balaguer	51	(7)
2010–2013	FC Andorra	65	(16)
2013–2016	FC Santa Coloma	50	(19)
2016–2019	FC Andorra	48	(6)
2019–2021	Inter d'Escaldes	34	(10)
2021–2022	FC Santa Coloma	18	(1)
2022–2023	Engordany	17	(3)
2023–2024	Ordino	11	(0)
2024–2026	Atlètic d'Escaldes	32	(1)

International career
2000–2026	Andorra	124	(5)
- * Club domestic league appearances and goals as of 23 May 2026

Marc Pujol Pons (born 21 August 1982) is a former Andorran footballer who played as a midfielder.

== Career ==
He finished in third place at Primera Catalana 2000–01, and promotion to Tercera division with Andorra. He also finished in third place at Tercera division group 5 2002–03 with Sant Andreu. He later signed with the Peña Deportiva.

Later on, Pujol achieved second place at Primera Territorial Catalana 2010–11 and promoted to Segona Catalana with Andorra. He also attained second place at Segona Catalana 2011–12 and promoted to Primera Catalana with Andorra. He later won Andorra's Primera Divisió 2013–14 with FC Santa Coloma.

== International ==
Pujol made his debut for Andorra in a friendly game against Albania on 6 February 2000, becoming at 17 years and 5 months his country’s youngest player, beating Ildefons Lima’s record. His record was eventually beaten by Iván Lorenzo in 2003 and then Sergi Moreno in 2004. Pujol played in a match against England at Old Trafford held on 2 September 2006 but had to withdraw shortly after the start of the second half due to a leg injury after a tangle with Ashley Cole.

On 12 October 2021, Pujol scored his fourth goal for Andorra during a 2022 FIFA World Cup qualification game against San Marino, becoming at 39 years and 1 months their oldest-ever goalscorer as well as UEFA's oldest FIFA World Cup qualification goalscorer, though the latter record was beaten on 7 June 2025 by Bosnian Edin Džeko. Three years later, on 13 October 2024, he scored his fifth goal for Andorra in a friendly, again against San Marino, and in doing so at the age of 42 years and 53 days, he became the oldest European international goalscorer, breaking a 68-year-old record set by Stanley Matthews in 1956, at 41 years and 248 days.

He retired from the Andorra national team at the age of 43 on 4 June 2026.

== National team statistics ==
As of 4 June 2026

Andorra national team
Year	Apps	Goals
2000	4	0
2001	1	0
2002	4	0
2003	5	0
2004	5	1
2005	5	0
2006	5	0
2007	5	0
2008	5	1
2009	4	0
2010	5	0
2011	3	0
2012	6	0
2013	4	0
2014	4	0
2015	1	0
2016	6	0
2017	7	0
2018	2	0
2019	2	0
2020	7	0
2021	9	2
2022	6	0
2023	7	0
2024	8	1
2025	1	0
2026	2	0
Total	124	5

=== International goals ===
Scores and results list Andorra's goal tally first.

Goal	Date	Venue	Opponent	Score	Result	Competition
1.	8 September 2004	Estadi Comunal d'Andorra la Vella, Andorra la Vella, Andorra	Romania	1–3	1–5	2006 FIFA World Cup qualification
2.	10 September 2008	Estadi Comunal d'Andorra la Vella, Andorra la Vella, Andorra	Belarus	1–1	1–3	2010 FIFA World Cup qualification
3.	31 March 2021	Estadi Nacional, Andorra la Vella, Andorra	Hungary	1–4	1–4	2022 FIFA World Cup qualification
4.	12 October 2021	San Marino Stadium, Serravalle, San Marino	San Marino	1–0	3–0	2022 FIFA World Cup qualification
5.	13 October 2024	Estadi Nacional, Andorra la Vella, Andorra	San Marino	2–0	2–0	Friendly
