= Txema García =

Association football player

Personal information
- Full name: José Manuel García Luena
- Date of birth: 4 December 1974 (age 51)
- Place of birth: San Sebastián, Spain
- Position: Left back

Team information
- Current team: FC Encamp
- Number: 22

International career
| Years | Team | Apps | (Gls) |
| 1997–2009 | Andorra | 71 | (0) |

José Manuel García Luena (born 4 December 1974) is a footballer who plays for FC Encamp as a defender. Born in Spain, he has represented Andorra internationally.

== National team statistics ==
Andorra national team
| Year | Apps | Goals |
|---|---|---|
| 1997 | 2 | 0 |
| 1998 | 8 | 0 |
| 1999 | 9 | 0 |
| 2000 | 8 | 0 |
| 2001 | 6 | 0 |
| 2002 | 5 | 0 |
| 2003 | 7 | 0 |
| 2004 | 7 | 0 |
| 2005 | 4 | 0 |
| 2006 | 4 | 0 |
| 2007 | 6 | 0 |
| 2008 | 4 | 0 |
| 2009 | 1 | 0 |
| Total | 71 | 0 |
