= Maciej Żurawski =

Maciej Żurawski may refer to:

- Maciej Żurawski (footballer, born 1976), Polish footballer
- Maciej Żurawski (footballer, born 2000), Polish footballer

== See also ==
- Maciej Żurowski (1915–2003), Polish historian
- Maciej Zworski (born 1963), Polish-Canadian mathematician
