= Goran Maznov =

Macedonian footballer

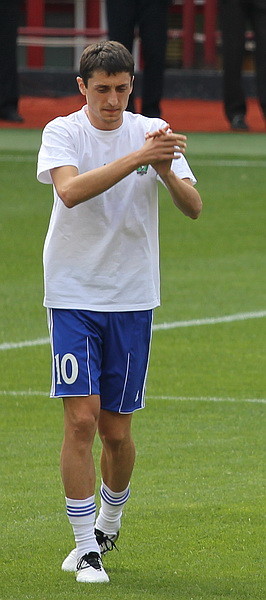

Personal information
- Full name: Goran Maznov; Горан Мазнов
- Date of birth: 22 April 1981 (age 45)
- Place of birth: Strumica, SR Macedonia, SFR Yugoslavia
- Height: 1.85 m (6 ft 1 in)
- Position: Striker

Senior career*
| Years | Team | Apps | (Gls) |
| 1999–2001 | Sloga Jugomagnat | 21 | (4) |
| 2001–2004 | Spartak Moscow | 2 | (0) |
| 2002 | → Torpedo-ZIL Moscow (loan) | 13 | (1) |
| 2003–2004 | → Baltika Kaliningrad (loan) | 56 | (11) |
| 2005 | Rabotnički | 12 | (7) |
| 2005–2006 | Diyarbakırspor | 30 | (7) |
| 2006–2007 | Lokeren | 23 | (4) |
| 2007–2010 | Tom Tomsk | 79 | (21) |
| 2011–2012 | Kerkyra | 18 | (3) |
| 2012–2013 | Metalurg Skopje | 28 | (4) |
| 2013–2014 | Shkëndija | 9 | (3) |
| 2014–2015 | Shkupi | 30 | (14) |
| 2015–2016 | Belasica | | |
| 2016 | Dojransko Ezero | | |
| Total | | 321 | (79) |

International career
| 2001–2009 | Macedonia | 45 | (10) |
- * Club domestic league appearances and goals

Goran Maznov (Macedonian: Горан Мазнов; born 22 April 1981) is a Macedonian former football striker.

== Club career ==
Internationally he last played for Kerkyra. Previously he changes several clubs in Russia. He also played for Republic of Macedonia. In March 2009 he was the only scorer for Tom Tomsk in the surprising away win over CSKA Moscow.

== International career ==
He made his senior debut for Macedonia in a July 2001 friendly match against Qatar and has earned a total of 45 caps, scoring 10 goals. His final international was a June 2009 FIFA World Cup qualification match against Norway in Skopje.

== International goals ==
| No. | Date | Venue | Opponent | Score | Result | Competition |
|---|---|---|---|---|---|---|
| 1. | 30 March 2005 | Skopje, North Macedonia | Romania | 1–1 | 1–2 | 2006 FIFA World Cup qualification |
| 2. | 7 September 2005 | Tampere, Finland | Finland | 1–3 | 1–5 | 2006 FIFA World Cup qualification |
| 3. | 12 September 2007 | Skopje, North Macedonia | Estonia | 1–1 | 1–1 | UEFA Euro 2008 qualifying |
| 4. | 17 November 2007 | Skopje, North Macedonia | Croatia | 1–0 | 2–0 | UEFA Euro 2008 qualifying |
