= Iván Lorenzo =

Andorran footballer

Personal information
- Full name: Iván Lorenzo Roncero
- Date of birth: 15 April 1986 (age 40)
- Place of birth: Andorra la Vella, Andorra
- Position: Winger

Team information
- Current team: Benabarre

Youth career
- 2002–2004: FC Andorra
- 2004–2006: Lleida

Senior career*
| Years | Team | Apps | (Gls) |
| 2006–2009 | Lleida B | | |
| 2009–2012 | Alcampell | | |
| 2012–2013 | Barbastro | 24 | (4) |
| 2013–2014 | Atlètic Alpicat | 32 | (6) |
| 2014–2015 | Mollerussa | | |
| 2015–2016 | Fraga | ? | (4) |
| 2016– | Benabarre | | |

International career^{‡}
| 2003– | Andorra | 28 | (0) |
- * Club domestic league appearances and goals ‡ National team caps and goals as of 13 October 2014

Iván Lorenzo Roncero (born 15 April 1986) is an Andorran footballer who plays for Spanish club UD Benabarre as a winger.

He made his international debut for Andorra in a friendly game against Gabon on 13 June 2003, becoming at 17 years and one month Andorra’s youngest player. However his record was beaten by Sergi Moreno in 2004.
