= Jordi Escura =

Andorran footballer

Jordi Escura Aixàs
Personal information
- Full name: Jordi Escura Aixas
- Date of birth: 19 April 1980 (age 46)
- Place of birth: Andorra la Vella, Andorra
- Height: 1.78 m (5 ft 10 in)
- Position: Defender

Youth career
- 1997–2000: CE Europa

Senior career*
Years	Team	Apps	(Gls)
2000–2001	CE Europa	4	(0)
2001–2002	FC Andorra	17	(1)
2002–2003	Ascó	23	(0)
2003–2004	CE Europa	7	(0)
2004–2005	Mollerussa	12	(1)
2005–2009	Benavent		
2009–2010	Balaguer	30	(1)
2010–2013	Alcarràs		
Total		93	(3)

International career
1998–2011	Andorra	65	(0)
- * Club domestic league appearances and goals

Jordi Escura Aixas (born 19 April 1980) is an Andorran former footballer. He played for 13 years with the Andorra national football team from 1998 to 2011, during which time he made 65 appearances without scoring. Escura worked as a physiotherapist with UE Lleida from 2005 to 2011 and then with RCD Espanyol for two seasons.

After this, he went to Thailand to work for Buriram United until the end of the season. They won the Thai Premier League, FA Cup and Toyota Cup, also arriving to Asian Champions League Quarter finals. Until finishing 2015 Escura worked as a university professor in two different universities: Universitat de Lleida and Universidad San Jorge.

In 2016, he joined Qingdao Huanghai from China League One as Head Physio and stayed there until the end of 2020. The team promoted to Chinese Super League in 2019 and avoid relegation in 2020.

In 2021 he signed for Cangzhou Mighty Lions F.C. still in China Super League but ended early and joined the Ukraine women's national football team as assistant coach of Lluís Cortés

== National team statistics ==
Andorra national team
Year	Apps	Goals
1998	2	0
1999	4	0
2000	7	0
2001	6	0
2002	5	0
2003	5	0
2004	5	0
2005	7	0
2006	1	0
2007	8	0
2008	5	0
2009	4	0
2010	6	0
2011	1	0
Total	65	0
