= Juli Fernández =

Andorran footballer

Juli Fernàndez
Personal information
- Full name: Julià Fernàndez Ariza
- Date of birth: 19 November 1974 (age 51)
- Place of birth: Andorra
- Height: 1.88 m (6 ft 2 in)
- Position: Defender

Team information
- Current team: Santa Coloma

Senior career*
Years	Team	Apps	(Gls)
1996–1997	FC Andorra B		
1997–2001	FC Andorra		
2001–2003	Santa Coloma		
2003–2004	FC Andorra		
2004–2010	Santa Coloma		

International career^{‡}
1998–2009	Andorra	36	(1)
- * Club domestic league appearances and goals as of 1 December 2021 ‡ National team caps and goals as of 29 June 2009

Julià Fernàndez Ariza (born 19 November 1974) is an Andorran footballer. He currently plays for Santa Coloma and the Andorra national team. He has won both the Andorran First Division and the Andorran Cup several times.

== Club career ==
Fernàndez scored the only goal in the UEFA Cup 2007–08 first qualifying round against Maccabi Tel Aviv, the first goal ever in a win for a team from Andorra in a European Cup. However, Maccabi Tel Aviv went on to win 4–0.

== International career ==
He also scored a consolation goal for Andorra in the squad's 2008 UEFA European Football Championship qualifying match against Israel.

=== International goal ===
Scores and results list Andorra's goal tally first.

No.	Date	Venue	Opponent	Score	Result	Competition
1.	6 September 2006	Stadion de Goffert, Nijmegen (Netherlands	Israel	1–4	1–4	Euro 2008 qualifier

== National team statistics ==
Andorra national team
Year	Apps	Goals
1998	1	0
1999	0	0
2000	0	0
2001	3	0
2002	6	0
2003	7	0
2004	7	0
2005	5	0
2006	2	1
2007	2	0
2008	1	0
2009	2	0
Total	36	1
