= Josep Ayala =

Andorran international footballer

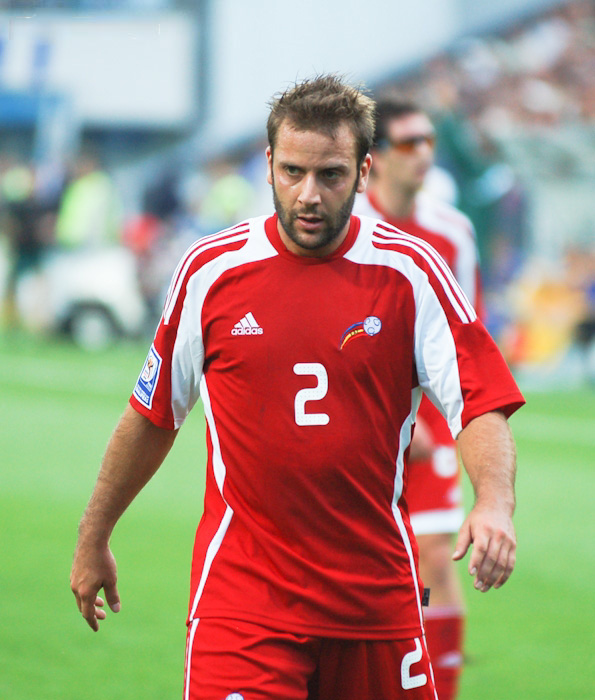
- Ayala playing for Andorra in 2009

Personal information
- Full name: Josep Manel Ayala Díaz
- Date of birth: 8 April 1980 (age 46)
- Place of birth: Sant Julià de Lòria, Andorra
- Height: 1.76 m (5 ft 9 in)
- Position: Midfielder

Team information
- Current team: Inter d'Escaldes
- Number: 8

Senior career*
Years	Team	Apps	(Gls)
2000–2002	FC Andorra		
2002–2003	FC Santa Coloma		
2003–2004	FC Andorra		
2004–2005	FC Santa Coloma		
2005–2006	Luzenac	21	(0)
2006–2008	FC Santa Coloma		
2008–2009	Binéfar	10	(0)
2009–2010	FC Santa Coloma		
2010–2015	FC Andorra		
2015–2017	UE Santa Coloma	41	(3)
2017–	Inter d'Escaldes		

International career^{‡}
2002–2017	Andorra	84	(1)
- * Club domestic league appearances and goals as of 14 May 2017 ‡ National team caps and goals as of 15:36, 16 September 2025 (UTC)

Josep Manel Ayala Díaz (born 8 April 1980) is an Andorran international footballer. He currently plays as a midfielder for Inter Club d'Escaldes. Ayala formerly played for FC Santa Coloma, US Luzenac, CD Binéfar and FC Andorra. He made his international debut in 2002.

== International career ==
Ayala was a player of Andorra national football team. He had 84 caps. His last match was the Andorran victory against Hungary, the second official win in the history of the Andorran national team.

== Career statistics ==
=== International ===
Appearances and goals by national team and year
National team	Year	Apps	Goals
Andorra	2002	4	0
Andorra	2003	6	0
Andorra	2004	5	0
Andorra	2005	6	0
Andorra	2006	5	0
Andorra	2007	8	0
Andorra	2008	6	0
Andorra	2009	6	0
Andorra	2010	7	0
Andorra	2011	6	1
Andorra	2012	7	0
Andorra	2013	6	0
Andorra	2014	5	0
Andorra	2015	4	0
Andorra	2016	2	0
Andorra	2017	1	0
Total		84	1

Scores and results list Andorra's goal tally first, score column indicates score after each Ayala goal.

List of international goals scored by Josep Ayala
No.	Date	Venue	Opponent	Score	Result	Competition	Ref.
1	9 February 2011	Estádio Municipal Fernando Cabrita, Lagos, Portugal	Moldova	1–0	1–2	Friendly	
