= Ilčo Naumoski =

Macedonian footballer

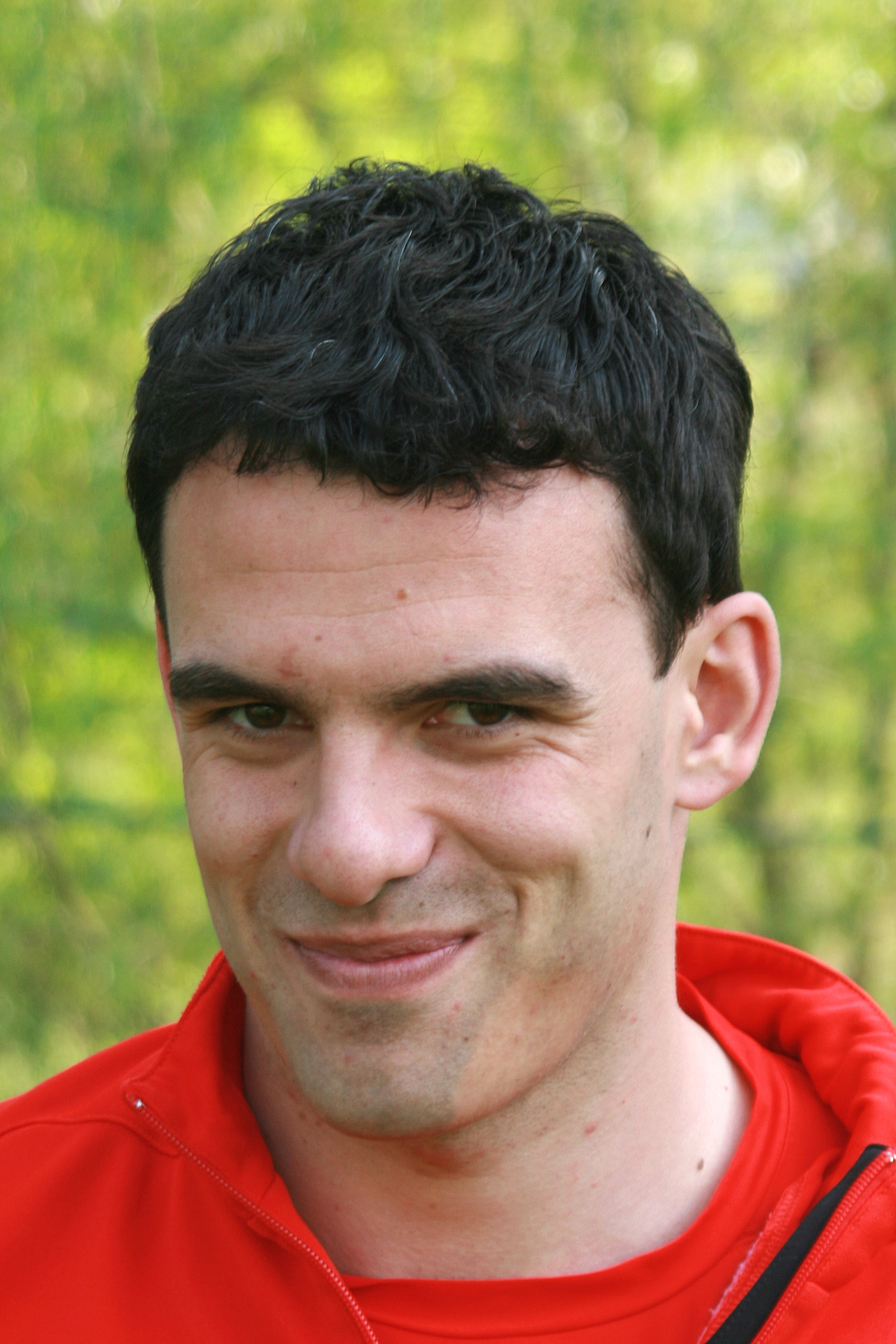

Personal information
- Full name: Ilcho Naumoski; Илчо Наумоски
- Date of birth: 29 July 1983 (age 43)
- Place of birth: Prilep, SR Macedonia, SFR Yugoslavia
- Height: 1.91 m (6 ft 3 in)
- Position: Striker

Team information
- Current team: Dinamo Vranje (assistant)

Youth career
- 1995–2000: SK Rapid Wien

Senior career*
| Years | Team | Apps | (Gls) |
| 2000–2001 | SV Stockerau | | |
| 2001–2002 | ASKÖ Klingenbach | | |
| 2002–2004 | Grazer AK | 22 | (8) |
| 2004 | Malatyaspor | 3 | (0) |
| 2005 | Catania | 0 | (0) |
| 2005–2013 | Mattersburg | 227 | (51) |
| 2013 | Inter Baku | 4 | (0) |
| 2014 | Vardar | 3 | (2) |
| Total | | 259 | (61) |

International career^{‡}
| 2003–2012 | Macedonia | 46 | (9) |

Managerial career
- 2018–: Dinamo Vranje (assistant)
- * Club domestic league appearances and goals as of 22 December 2013 ‡ National team caps and goals as of 29 February 2012

Ilčo Naumoski (Macedonian: Илчо Наумоски) (born 29 July 1983 in Prilep) is a Macedonian football player currently playing as a striker for FK Vardar in Macedonia. He has spent the majority of his career in Austria, having played with Grazer AK from 2002 to 2004 and for Mattersburg from 2005 until 2013.

== Club career ==
=== Inter Baku ===
In August 2013, Naumoski signed a one-year contract with Inter Baku of the Azerbaijan Premier League, with the option of a second year. After only 4 appearances for the club and no goals, Naumoski's contract was terminated.

== International career ==
He made his senior debut for Macedonia in a February 2003 friendly match against Croatia and has earned a total of 46 caps, scoring 9 goals. His final international was a February 2012 friendly against Luxembourg.

He scored one of his nine goals for Macedonia against Scotland.

=== International goals ===
| # | Date | Venue | Opponent | Score | Result | Competition |
|---|---|---|---|---|---|---|
| 1 | 20 August 2003 | Prilep | Albania | 3–1 | Win | Friendly |
| 2 | 11 October 2006 | Andorra La Vella | Andorra | 3–0 | Win | UEFA Euro 2008 qualifying |
| 3 | 7 October 2007 | Skopje | Andorra | 3–0 | Win | UEFA Euro 2008 qualifying |
| 4 | 17 November 2007 | Skopje | Croatia | 2–0 | Win | UEFA Euro 2008 qualifying |
| 5 | 20 August 2008 | Luxembourg | Luxembourg | 4–1 | Win | Friendly |
| 6 | 6 September 2008 | Skopje | Scotland | 1–0 | Win | 2010 FIFA World Cup qualification |
| 7 | 3 March 2010 | Skopje | Montenegro | 2–1 | Win | Friendly |
| 8 | 7 September 2010 | Skopje | Armenia | 2–2 | Draw | UEFA Euro 2012 qualifying |
| 9 | 8 October 2010 | Andorra La Vella | Andorra | 2–0 | Win | UEFA Euro 2012 qualifying |
