= Xavi Andorrà =

Andorran footballer

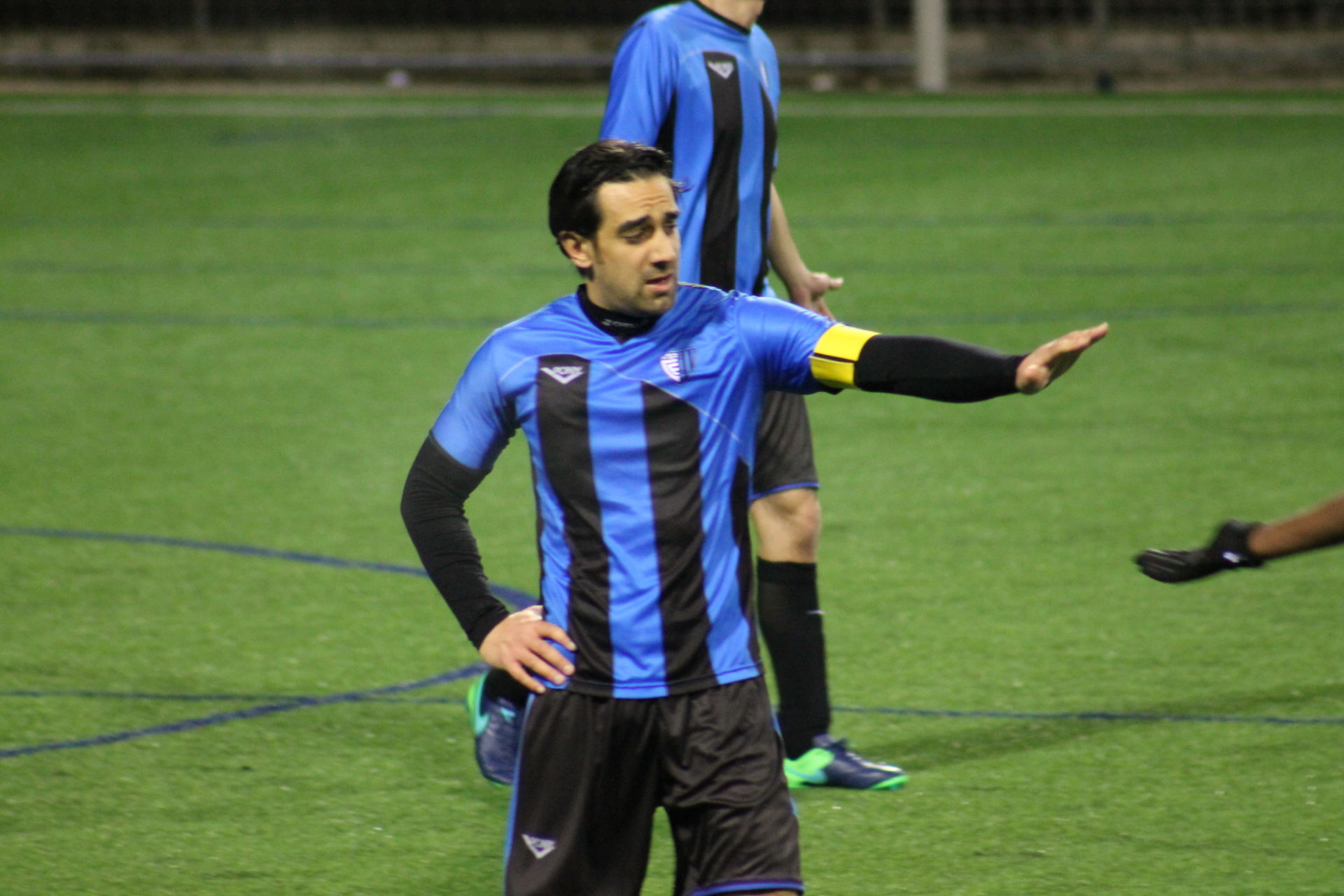

Personal information
- Full name: Javier Andorrà Julia
- Date of birth: 7 June 1985 (age 41)
- Height: 1.83 m (6 ft 0 in)
- Position: Forward

Team information
- Current team: Andorra B

Senior career*
Years	Team	Apps	(Gls)
2004–2006	Andorra		
2006–2007	Benicarló		
2007–2008	Gimnástico Alcázar	29	(0)
2008–2009	Binéfar	9	(3)
2009–2012	Andorra		
2012–2013	IC d'Escaldes	11	(3)
2013–2014	Andorra	25	(0)
2014–2015	Lusitanos	11	(2)
2015–2019	IC d'Escaldes	47	(12)
2019–	Andorra B	5	(1)

International career
2005–2013	Andorra	24	(0)
- * Club domestic league appearances and goals as of 18:04, 19 January 2020 (UTC)

Javier Andorrà Julia (born 7 June 1985) is an Andorran international footballer who plays for the B-team of FC Andorra as a forward.

== Career ==
He has played for FC Andorra, CD Benicarló, CF Gimnástico Alcázar, CD Binéfar, Inter Club d'Escaldes and FC Lusitanos.

He made his international debut for Andorra in 2005.
