= Fernando Silva (footballer, born 1977) =

Spanish footballer

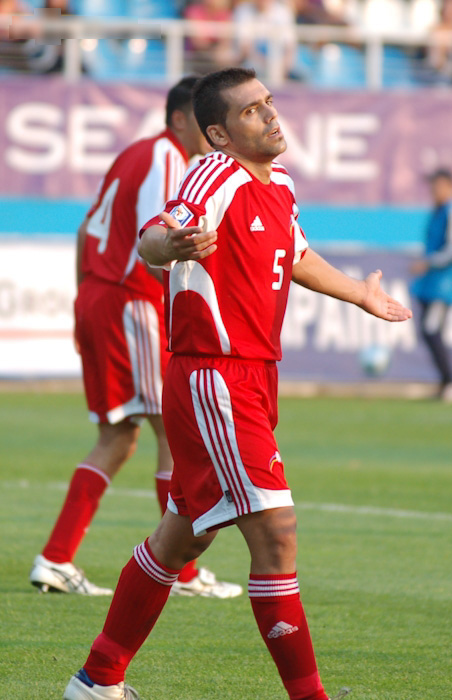
- Silva in action for Andorra in 2009

Personal information
- Full name: Fernando José Silva García
- Date of birth: 16 May 1977 (age 49)
- Place of birth: Barcelona, Spain
- Position: Forward

Senior career*
Years	Team	Apps	(Gls)
2002–2004	FC Andorra		
2004–2005	Cerro Reyes		
2005	Santa Coloma		
2005–2007	Santa Eulàlia	8	(0)
2007–2008	Imperio Mérida		
2008–2009	Villanovense		
2009–2010	Badajoz	10	(0)
2010–2011	Imperio Mérida	17	(1)
2011–2012	Guadiana		
2012–2014	Monte Louro		

International career
2002–2013	Andorra	51	(2)
- * Club domestic league appearances and goals

Fernando José Silva García (born 16 May 1977) is a former footballer who played as a forward.

Born in Spain, he has represented the Andorra national team internationally.

== Early life ==
Silva was born in Barcelona, Catalonia to Extremaduran parents and raised in Montijo.

== International goals ==
Scores and results list Andorra's goal tally first.

#	Date	Venue	Opponent	Score	Result	Competition	Ref.
1.	26 March 2005	Hanrapetakan Stadium, Yerevan, Armenia	Armenia	1–1	1–2	2006 World Cup qualifier	
2.	22 August 2007	A Le Coq Arena, Tallinn, Estonia	Estonia	1–1	1–2	Euro 2008 qualifying	
