= Sergi Moreno =

Andorran footballer

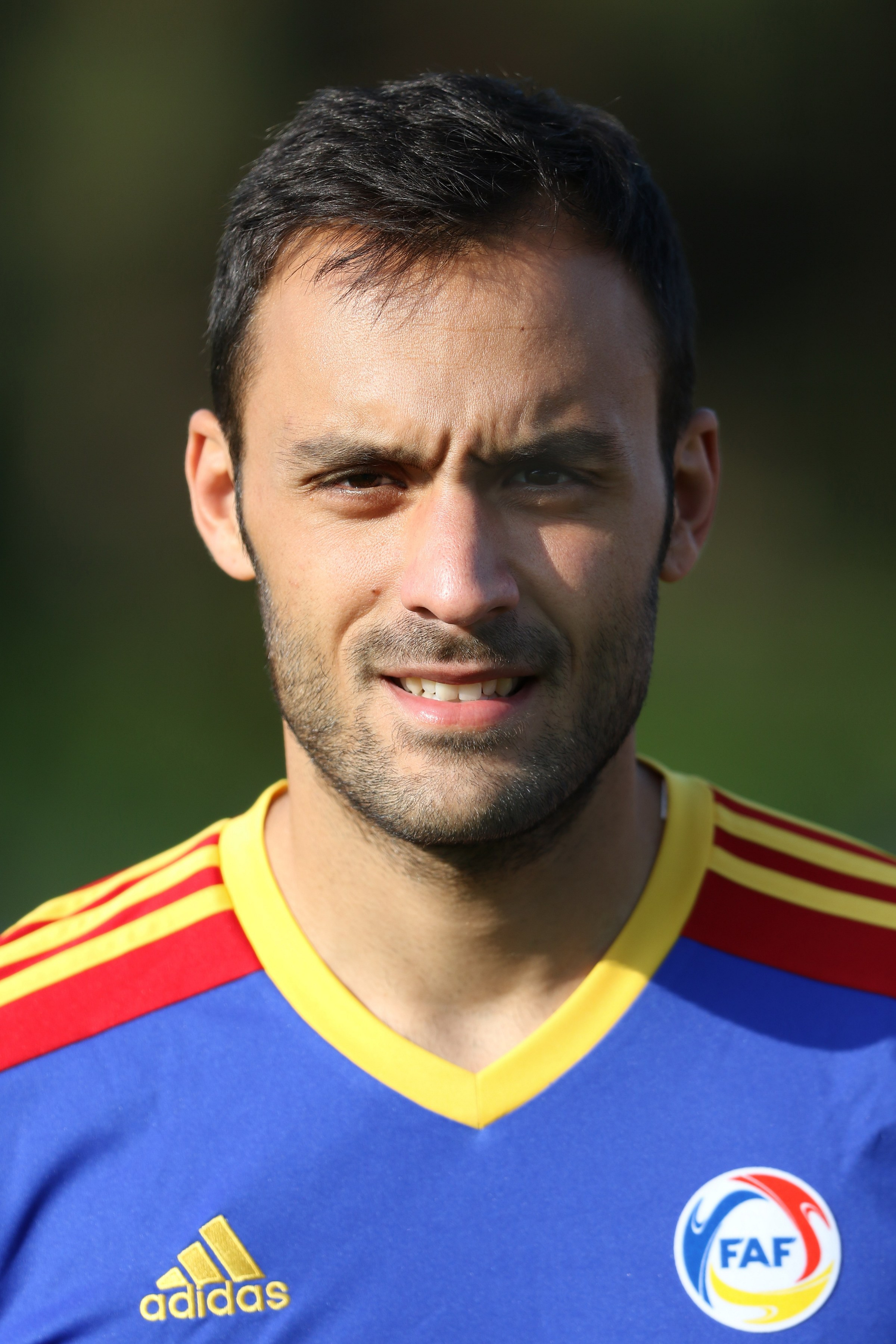
- Sergi Moreno in the Andorra national football team

Personal information
- Full name: Sergio Moreno Marín
- Date of birth: 25 November 1987 (age 38)
- Place of birth: Escaldes-Engordany, Andorra
- Height: 1.78 m (5 ft 10 in)
- Position: Midfielder

Team information
- Current team: Sporting d'Escaldes
- Number: 5

Youth career
- 2003–2004: FC Andorra
- 2004–2005: Lleida

Senior career*
Years	Team	Apps	(Gls)
2005–2006	Getafe B		
2006–2007	Ibiza-Eivissa		
2007–2010	Gimnástico Alcázar	87	(6)
2010–2011	Hellín	17	(0)
2011–2012	Forte dei Marmi		
2012	Vllaznia Shkodër	5	(0)
2012–2013	Hellín	13	(0)
2013–2014	Almansa	24	(1)
2014–2015	Gżira United		
2015	Jumilla	11	(0)
2015–2016	Yeclano	25	(2)
2016–2017	Ontinyent	12	(0)
2017	FC Andorra	16	(1)
2017–2022	Inter d'Escaldes	108	(11)
2022–2023	Hellín		
2023	Inter d'Escaldes	10	(0)
2024	Esperança	24	(1)
2025	Atlètic Club d'Escaldes	5	(0)
2025	Hellín		
2025–	Sporting d'Escaldes	11	(0)

International career^{‡}
2004–2025	Andorra	77	(1)
- * Club domestic league appearances and goals as of 18 April 2026 ‡ National team caps and goals as of 13 November 2025

Sergio "Sergi" Moreno Marín (born 25 November 1987) is an Andorran footballer who plays as a midfielder for Sporting d'Escaldes.

== International career ==
He made his debut for Andorra on 14 April 2004 in a friendly game against China, becoming at 16 years and 4 months Andorra’s youngest player ever, a record that still stands.

On 12 October 2021, in a 2022 FIFA World Cup qualification game against San Marino, he scored his first and only international goal with Andorra.

== International goal ==
Scores and results list Andorra's goal tally first.

No	Date	Venue	Opponent	Score	Result	Competition
1.	12 October 2021	San Marino Stadium, Serravalle, San Marino	San Marino	2–0	3–0	2022 World Cup qualifier
