= Andorra national football team results (1996–2019) =

The Andorra national football team represents Andorra in association football and is controlled by the Andorran Football Federation, the governing body of the sport there. It competes as a member of the Union of European Football Associations (UEFA), which encompasses the countries of Europe. Andorra joined UEFA and the International Federation of Association Football (FIFA) in 1996.

Andorra's first match—a 6–1 defeat against Estonia—took place on 13 November 1996. Their first victory came in their twenty fourth match, 2–0 against Belarus. They entered their first major international competition in 1998, the qualifying rounds for the 2000 UEFA European Football Championship. The team won their first non-friendly match on 13 October 2004 when they defeated Macedonia 1–0 in the 2006 FIFA World Cup qualification competition.

The team's largest victories came on 26 April 2000, 17 April 2002 and 22 February 2017 when they defeated Belarus, Albania and San Marino respectively by two goals to nil in friendly matches. Their worst losses are 8–1 against Czech Republic in 2005 and 7–0 against Croatia in 2006. Ildefons Lima holds the appearance record for Andorra, having been capped 109 times since 1997. Lima also holds the goalscoring record with eleven goals. As of April 2019, Andorra are ranked 134th in the FIFA World Rankings. Its highest ever ranking of 125th was achieved in September 2005.

Contents
- 1996
- 1997
- 1998
- 1999
- 2000
- 2001
- 2002
- 2003
- 2004
- 2005
- 2006
- 2007
- 2008
- 2009
- 2010
- 2011
- 2012
- 2013
- 2014
- 2015
- 2016
- 2017
- 2018
- 2019

- References
- External links

== Results ==
=== 1996 ===
13 November Friendly	Andorra	1–6	Estonia	Andorra la Vella, Andorra
	Pol 61'	Report	Zelinski 36'; Arbeiter 64', 74', 76', 84'; Kristal 87'	Stadium: Estadi Comunal d'Andorra la Vella; Attendance: 1,500; Referee: Celino Gracia Redondo (Spain)

=== 1997 ===
22 June Friendly	Estonia	4–1	Andorra	Kuressaare, Estonia
19:00	Zelinski 22'; Lemsalu 28'; Oper 66'; Pari 88'	Report	Lima 67'	Stadium: Kuressaare linnastaadion Attendance: 932; Referee: Jarmo Karhunen (Finland)

25 June Friendly	Latvia	4–1	Andorra	Riga, Latvia
18:00	Štolcers 36'; Bleidelis 58', 82'; Stepanovs 83'	Report	Sonejee 63'	Stadium: Daugava Stadium; Attendance: 1,400; Referee: Oleg Timofejev (Estonia)

=== 1998 ===
3 June Friendly	Andorra	0–3	Brazil	Saint-Ouen, France
17:30		Report	Giovanni 26'; Rivaldo 27'; Cafu 53'	Stadium: Stade de Paris; Attendance: 5,500; Referee: Pascal Garibian (France)

22 June Friendly	Estonia	2–1	Andorra	Kuressaare, Estonia
18:15	Zelinski 29'; Oper 76'	Report	Lucendo 56'	Stadium: Kuressaare linnastaadion Attendance: 1,000; Referee: Oleg Timofejev (Estonia)

24 June Friendly	Andorra	0–0	Azerbaijan	Tallinn, Estonia
		Report		Stadium: Maarjamäe staadion Attendance: 20; Referee: Margus Kotter (Estonia)

26 June Friendly	Latvia	2–0	Andorra	Pärnu, Estonia
18:00	Rimkus 75'; Bleidelis 82'	Report		Stadium: Rannastaadion; Attendance: 70; Referee: Oleg Timofejev (Estonia)

29 June Friendly	Lithuania	4–0	Andorra	Karksi-Nuia, Estonia
	Tereškinas 20'; Morinas 22'; Mikulėnas 43'; Vasiliauskas 78'	Report		Stadium: Linnastaadion; Attendance: 60; Referee: Jüri Saar (Estonia)

5 September UEFA Euro 2000 qualifying	Armenia	3–1	Andorra	Yerevan, Armenia
15:00	Avalyan 40'; Yesayan 71', 90'	Report	Lucendo 85' (pen.)	Stadium: Hrazdan Stadium; Attendance: 8,000; Referee: Richard O'Hanlon (Ireland)

10 October UEFA Euro 2000 qualifying	Andorra	0–2	Ukraine	Andorra la Vella, Andorra
18:00		Report	Kosovskyi 32'; Rebrov 44'	Stadium: Estadi Comunal d'Andorra la Vella; Attendance: 850; Referee: Anton Guetzov (Bulgaria)

14 October UEFA Euro 2000 qualifying	France	2–0	Andorra	Paris, France
20:45	Candela 54'; Djorkaeff 59'	Report		Stadium: Stade de France; Attendance: 75,416; Referee: Dani Koren (Israel)

=== 1999 ===
3 March Friendly	Andorra	0–0	Faroe Islands	San Fernando, Spain
16:00		Report		Stadium: Estadio Bahía Sur; Attendance: 100; Referee: Antonio Jesús López Nieto (Spain)

27 March UEFA Euro 2000 qualifying	Andorra	0–2	Iceland	Andorra la Vella, Andorra
19:00		Report	E. Sverrisson 58'; Adolfsson 67'	Stadium: Estadi Comunal d'Andorra la Vella; Attendance: 900; Referee: Charles Agius (Malta)

31 March UEFA Euro 2000 qualifying	Russia	6–1	Andorra	Moscow, Russia
17:00	Titov 8'; Beschastnykh 11', 62'; Onopko 42'; Tsymbalar 50'; Alenichev 90'	Report	Justo Ruiz 73'	Stadium: Central Stadium Lokomotiv; Attendance: 10,333; Referee: Mikko Vuorela (Finland)

5 June UEFA Euro 2000 qualifying	Ukraine	4–0	Andorra	Kyiv, Ukraine
18:00	Popov 38'; Rebrov 41'; Dmytrulin 56'; Husyn 89'	Report		Stadium: Olimpiysky National Sports Complex; Attendance: 49,000; Referee: Andreas Georgiou (Cyprus)

9 June UEFA Euro 2000 qualifying	Andorra	0–1	France	Barcelona, Spain
20:45		Report	Leboeuf 86' (pen.)	Stadium: Estadi Olímpic de Montjuïc; Attendance: 7,600; Referee: Michael Ross (Northern Ireland)

18 August Friendly	Portugal	4–0	Andorra	Oeiras, Portugal
22:00	Rui Costa 17'; João Pinto 35'; Figo 45'; Pauleta 67'	Report		Stadium: Estádio Nacional; Attendance: 5,210; Referee: Bruno Coué (France)

4 September UEFA Euro 2000 qualifying	Iceland	3–0	Andorra	Reykjavík, Iceland
18:00	Þ.Guðjónsson 29'; Hreidarsson 32'; E.Guðjohnsen 90'	Report		Stadium: Laugardalsvöllur; Attendance: 5,210; Referee: Miroslav Liba (Czech Republic)

8 September UEFA Euro 2000 qualifying	Andorra	1–2	Russia	Andorra la Vella, Andorra
18:30	Justo Ruiz 39' (pen.)	Report	Onopko 22', 57'	Stadium: Estadi Comunal d'Andorra la Vella; Attendance: 1,000; Referee: Jørn Larsen (Denmark)

9 October UEFA Euro 2000 qualifying	Andorra	0–3	Armenia	Andorra la Vella, Andorra
16:00		Report	A.Petrosyan 26'; Yesayan 59'; Shahgeldyan 63'	Stadium: Camp d'Esports d'Aixovall; Attendance: 700; Referee: Peter Jones (England)

=== 2000 ===
6 February Rothmans International Tournament	Albania	3–0	Andorra	Ta' Qali, Malta
14:00	Dalipi 63' (pen.); Vata 86'; Zajmi 90'	Report		Stadium: Ta' Qali National Stadium; Attendance: 2,500; Referee: Joseph Attard (Malta)

8 February Rothmans International Tournament	Malta	1–1	Andorra	Ta' Qali, Malta
19:15	Mallia 15'	Report	Sonejee 2'	Stadium: Ta' Qali National Stadium; Attendance: 2,624; Referee: Bujar Pregia (Albania)

10 February Rothmans International Tournament	Andorra	0–0	Azerbaijan	Ta' Qali, Malta
14:00		Report		Stadium: Ta' Qali National Stadium; Attendance: 2,000; Referee: Lawrence Sammut (Malta)

26 April Friendly	Andorra	2–0	Belarus	Aixovall, Andorra
21:00	Lucendo 57'; Sánchez 62'	Report		Stadium: Estadi Comunal d'Aixovall; Attendance: 500; Referee: Arturo Daudén Ibáñez (Spain)

16 August 2002 FIFA World Cup qualification	Estonia	1–0	Andorra	Tallinn, Estonia
17:00	Reim 66' (pen.)	Report		Stadium: Kadriorg Stadium; Attendance: 1,600; Referee: Zoran Arsić (Yugoslavia)

2 September 2002 FIFA World Cup qualification	Andorra	2–3	Cyprus	Andorra la Vella, Andorra
17:30	González 45'; I. Lima 52'	Report	Konstantinou 25' (pen.), 90'; Agathokleous 77'	Stadium: Estadi Comunal d'Andorra la Vella; Attendance: 600; Referee: Ihor Yarmenchuk (Ukraine)

7 October 2002 FIFA World Cup qualification	Andorra	1–2	Estonia	Andorra la Vella, Andorra
16:00	Ruiz 90+1' (pen.)	Report	Reim 55'; Oper 65'	Stadium: Estadi Comunal d'Andorra la Vella; Attendance: 650; Referee: Dani Koren (Israel)

15 November 2002 FIFA World Cup qualification	Cyprus	5–0	Andorra	Limassol, Cyprus
18:00	Okkas 10', 18'; Agathokleous 43'; Christodoulou 73'; Špoljarić 90' (pen.)	Report		Stadium: Tsirion Stadium; Attendance: 1,193; Referee: Sten Johanzon (Sweden)

=== 2001 ===
28 February 2002 FIFA World Cup qualification	Portugal	3–0	Andorra	Funchal, Portugal
22:00	Figo 1', 49'; Pauleta 36'	Report		Stadium: Estádio dos Barreiros; Attendance: 9,000; Referee: Paul Allaerts (Belgium)

24 March 2002 FIFA World Cup qualification	Andorra	0–5	Netherlands	Barcelona, Spain
20:30		Report	Kluivert 9'; Hasselbaink 36'; Van Hooijdonk 61', 70'; Van Bommel 84'	Stadium: Mini Estadi; Attendance: 3,823; Referee: Edo Trivković (Croatia)

28 March 2002 FIFA World Cup qualification	Andorra	0–3	Republic of Ireland	Barcelona, Spain
18:30		Report	Harte 33' (pen.); Kilbane 76'; Holland 80'	Stadium: Mini Estadi; Attendance: 5,000; Referee: Ihor Ishchenko (Ukraine)

25 April 2002 FIFA World Cup qualification	Republic of Ireland	3–1	Andorra	Dublin, Ireland
19:00	Kilbane 33'; Kinsella 36'; Breen 73'	Report	Lima 31'	Stadium: Lansdowne Road; Attendance: 35,000; Referee: Kristinn Jakobsson (Iceland)

9 September 2002 FIFA World Cup qualification	Andorra	1–7	Portugal	Lleida, Spain
22:00	Jonas 42'	Report	Nuno Gomes 36', 40', 45', 90'; Pauleta 39'; Rui Jorge 45'; Conceição 58'	Stadium: Camp d'Esports; Attendance: 4,876; Referee: Terje Hauge (Norway)

6 October 2002 FIFA World Cup qualification	Netherlands	4–0	Andorra	Arnhem, Netherlands
20:30	Van Hooijdonk 3' (pen.); Seedorf 45'; Van Nistelrooy 53', 89'	Report		Stadium: GelreDome; Attendance: 20,000; Referee: Orhan Erdemir (Turkey)

=== 2002 ===
27 March Friendly	Malta	1–1	Andorra	Ta' Qali, Malta
19:00	Theuma 87'	Report	Lima 78'	Stadium: Ta' Qali National Stadium; Attendance: 483; Referee: Stefano Podeschi (San Marino)

17 April Friendly	Andorra	2–0	Albania	Andorra la Vella, Andorra
	González 34' (pen.); Jiménez 58'	Report		Stadium: Estadi Comunal; Attendance: 250; Referee: Arturo Daudén Ibáñez (Spain)

7 June Friendly	Andorra	0–2	Armenia	Andorra la Vella, Andorra
		Report	Shahgeldyan 8'; Karamyan 81'	Stadium: Estadi Comunal d'Andorra la Vella; Referee: Joaquim Paulo Paraty da Silva (Portugal)

21 August Friendly	Iceland	3–0	Andorra	Reykjavík, Iceland
21:30	Guðjohnsen 19'; Daðason 26', 43'	Report		Stadium: Laugardalsvöllur; Attendance: 2,982; Referee: Lassin Isaksen (Faroe Islands)

12 October UEFA Euro 2004 qualifying	Andorra	0–1	Belgium	Aixovall, Andorra
20:00		Report	Sonck 61'	Stadium: Estadi Comunal d'Aixovall; Attendance: 1,100; Referee: Karen Nalbandyan (Armenia)

16 October UEFA Euro 2004 qualifying	Bulgaria	2–1	Andorra	Sofia, Bulgaria
17:00	Chilikov 37'; Balakov 58'	Report	A. Lima 80'	Stadium: Vasil Levski National Stadium; Attendance: 25,500; Referee: Ceri Richards (Wales)

=== 2003 ===
2 April UEFA Euro 2004 qualifying	Croatia	2–0	Andorra	Varaždin, Croatia
18:00	Rapaić 10' (pen.), 43'	Report		Stadium: Stadion Varteks; Attendance: 8,290; Referee: Marian Salomir (Russia)

30 April UEFA Euro 2004 qualifying	Andorra	0–2	Estonia	Aixovall, Andorra
17:00		Report	Zelinski 26', 74'	Stadium: Estadi Comunal d'Aixovall; Attendance: 850; Referee: Ali Aydın (Turkey)

7 June UEFA Euro 2004 qualifying	Estonia	2–0	Andorra	Tallinn, Estonia
18:00	Allas 22'; Viikmäe 31'	Report		Stadium: A. Le Coq Arena; Attendance: 2,700; Referee: Attila Juhos (Hungary)

11 June UEFA Euro 2004 qualifying	Belgium	3–0	Andorra	Ghent, Belgium
20:15	Goor 21', 69'; Sonck 45'	Report		Stadium: Jules Ottenstadion; Attendance: 11,747; Referee: Siarhei Shmolik (Belarus)

13 June Friendly	Andorra	0–2	Gabon	Andorra la Vella, Andorra
17:00		Report	Boutamba-Ibinga 41'; Moubamba 45'	Stadium: Estadi Comunal; Attendance: 800; Referee: Damien Ledentu (France)

6 September UEFA Euro 2004 qualifying	Andorra	0–3	Croatia	Aixovall, Andorra
16:00		Report	Kovač 4'; Šimunić 16'; Roso 71'	Stadium: Estadi Comunal d'Aixovall; Attendance: 800; Referee: Miroslav Liba (Czech Republic)

10 September UEFA Euro 2004 qualifying	Andorra	0–3	Bulgaria	Aixovall, Andorra
17:30		Report	Berbatov 11', 24'; Hristov 58'	Stadium: Estadi Comunal d'Aixovall; Attendance: 450; Referee: Tomasz Mikulski (Poland)

=== 2004 ===
14 April Friendly	Andorra	0–0	China	Peralada, Spain
17:00		Report		Stadium: Estadio Municipal

28 May Friendly	France	4–0	Andorra	Montpellier, France
17:45	Wiltord 45', 55'; Saha 68'; Marlet 74'	Report		Stadium: Stade de la Mosson; Attendance: 27,753; Referee: Mourad Daami (Tunisia)

5 June Friendly	Spain	4–0	Andorra	Getafe, Spain
22:00	Morientes 24'; Baraja 45'; César 64'; Valerón 89'	Report		Stadium: Coliseum Alfonso Pérez; Attendance: 14,000; Referee: Matteo Trefoloni (Italy)

4 September 2006 FIFA World Cup qualification	Finland	3–0	Andorra	Tampere, Finland
16:00	Eremenko 42', 64'; Riihilahti 58'	Report		Stadium: Ratina Stadion; Attendance: 7,437; Referee: Željko Širić (Croatia)

8 September 2006 FIFA World Cup qualification	Andorra	1–5	Romania	Aixovall, Andorra
16:00	Pujol 28' (pen.)	Report	Cernat 1', 17'; Pancu 5', 83'; Niculae 70'	Stadium: Estadi Comunal d'Aixovall; Attendance: 1,100; Referee: Knut Kircher (Germany)

13 October 2006 FIFA World Cup qualification	Andorra	1–0	Macedonia	Aixovall, Andorra
15:00	Bernaus 60'	Report		Stadium: Estadi Comunal d'Aixovall; Attendance: 350; Referee: Stefano Podesci (San Marino)

17 November 2006 FIFA World Cup qualification	Andorra	0–3	Netherlands	Barcelona, Spain
20:30		Report	Cocu 21'; Robben 31'; Sneijder 78'	Stadium: Mini Estadi; Attendance: 2,000; Referee: Alon Yefet (Israel)

=== 2005 ===
9 February 2006 FIFA World Cup qualification	Macedonia	0–0	Andorra	Skopje, Macedonia
16:00		Report		Stadium: Skopje City Stadium; Attendance: 5,000; Referee: Johan Verbist (Belgium)

26 March 2006 FIFA World Cup qualification	Armenia	2–1	Andorra	Yerevan, Armenia
15:00	Hakobyan 30'; Khachatryan 73'	Report	Silva 56'	Stadium: Hanrapetakan Stadium; Attendance: 2,100; Referee: Joseph Attard (Malta)

30 March 2006 FIFA World Cup qualification	Andorra	0–4	Czech Republic	Aixovall, Andorra
16:50		Report	Jankulovski 31' (pen.); Baroš 40'; Lokvenc 53'; Rosický 90+2' (pen.)	Stadium: Estadi Comunal d'Aixovall; Attendance: 900; Referee: Stefan Messner (Austria)

4 June 2006 FIFA World Cup qualification	Czech Republic	8–1	Andorra	Liberec, Czech Republic
17:00	Lokvenc 12', 90+2'; Koller 30'; Šmicer 37'; Galásek 52'; Baroš 79'; Rosický 84'; Polák 86'	Report	Riera 36'	Stadium: U Nisy Stadium; Attendance: 9,520; Referee: Selçuk Dereli (Turkey)

17 August 2006 FIFA World Cup qualification	Romania	2–0	Andorra	Constanța, Romania
21:30	Mutu 29', 41'	Report		Stadium: Stadionul Farul; Attendance: 8,200; Referee: Haim Jakov (Israel)

3 September 2006 FIFA World Cup qualification	Andorra	0–0	Finland	Aixovall, Andorra
16:00		Report		Stadium: Estadi Comunal d'Aixovall; Attendance: 860; Referee: Johny Ver Eecke (Belgium)

7 September 2006 FIFA World Cup qualification	Netherlands	4–0	Andorra	Eindhoven, Netherlands
20:30	Van der Vaart 23'; Cocu 27'; Van Nistelrooy 43', 89'	Report		Stadium: Philips Stadion; Attendance: 34,000; Referee: Attila Hanacsek (Hungary)

12 October 2006 FIFA World Cup qualification	Andorra	0–3	Armenia	Aixovall, Andorra
16:00		Report	Sonejee 40' (o.g.); Hakobyan 52', 62'	Stadium: Estadi Comunal d'Aixovall; Attendance: 430; Referee: Ian Stokes (Ireland)

=== 2006 ===
16 August Friendly	Belarus	3–0	Andorra	Minsk, Belarus
20:00	A. Hleb 35'; Bulyga 76'; Kornilenko 84'	Report		Stadium: Dinamo Stadium; Attendance: 7,500; Referee: Audrius Žuta (Lithuania)

2 September UEFA Euro 2008 qualifying	England	5–0	Andorra	Manchester, England
18:00	Crouch 5', 66'; Gerrard 13'; Defoe 38', 47'	Report		Stadium: Old Trafford; Attendance: 56,290; Referee: Bernhard Brugger (Austria)

6 September UEFA Euro 2008 qualifying	Israel	4–1	Andorra	Nijmegen, Netherlands
19:00	Benayoun 9'; Ben-Shushan 11'; Gershon 43' (pen.); Tamuz 69'	Report	Fernandez 84'	Stadium: Stadion de Goffert; Attendance: 400; Referee: Sinisa Zrnic (Bosnia)

7 October UEFA Euro 2008 qualifying	Croatia	7–0	Andorra	Zagreb, Croatia
20:15	Petrić 12', 37', 48', 50'; Klasnić 58'; Balaban 62'; Modrić 83'	Report		Stadium: Maksimir Stadium; Attendance: 17,618; Referee: Anthony Zammit (Malta)

11 October UEFA Euro 2008 qualifying	Andorra	0–3	Macedonia	Andorra la Vella, Andorra
15:00		Report	Pandev 13'; Noveski 16'; Naumoski 31'	Stadium: Estadi Comunal; Attendance: 300; Referee: Lasha Silagava (Georgia)

=== 2007 ===
7 February Friendly	Andorra	0–0	Armenia	Andorra la Vella, Andorra
20:30		Report		Stadium: Estadi Comunal; Attendance: 1,200; Referee: Carlos Megía Dávila (Spain)

28 March UEFA Euro 2008 qualifying	Andorra	0–3	England	Barcelona, Spain
21:00		Report	Gerrard 54', 76'; Nugent 90+2'	Stadium: Olímpic Lluís Companys; Attendance: 12,800; Referee: Bruno Paixão (Portugal)

2 June UEFA Euro 2008 qualifying	Russia	4–0	Andorra	Saint Petersburg, Russia
17:00	Kerzhakov 8', 16', 49'; Sychev 71'	Report		Stadium: Petrovsky Stadium; Attendance: 21,520; Referee: Tommy Skjerven (Norway)

6 June UEFA Euro 2008 qualifying	Andorra	0–2	Israel	Andorra la Vella, Andorra
18:00		Report	Tamuz 37'; Colautti 53'	Stadium: Estadi Comunal; Attendance: 618; Referee: Ian Stokes (Ireland)

22 August UEFA Euro 2008 qualifying	Estonia	2–1	Andorra	Tallinn, Estonia
18:00	Piiroja 34'; Zelinski 90+2'	Report	Silva 87'	Stadium: A Le Coq Arena; Attendance: 7,500; Referee: Adrian McCourt (Northern Ireland)

12 October UEFA Euro 2008 qualifying	Andorra	0–6	Croatia	Andorra la Vella, Andorra
18:00		Report	Srna 34'; Petrić 38', 44'; Kranjčar 49'; Eduardo 55'; Rakitić 64'	Stadium: Estadi Comunal; Attendance: 925; Referee: Olivier Thual (France)

17 October UEFA Euro 2008 qualifying	Macedonia	3–0	Andorra	Skopje, Macedonia
20:00	Naumoski 30'; Sedloski 44'; Pandev 59'	Report		Stadium: Skopje City Stadium; Attendance: 17,500; Referee: Paulius Malzinskas (Lithuania)

17 November UEFA Euro 2008 qualifying	Andorra	0–2	Estonia	Andorra la Vella, Andorra
18:00		Report	Oper 31'; Lindpere 60'	Stadium: Estadi Comunal; Attendance: 700; Referee: William Collum (Scotland)

21 November UEFA Euro 2008 qualifying	Andorra	0–1	Russia	Andorra la Vella, Andorra
21:00		Report	Sychev 38'	Stadium: Estadi Comunal; Attendance: 780; Referee: Terje Hauge (Norway)

=== 2008 ===
26 March Friendly	Andorra	0–3	Latvia	Andorra la Vella, Andorra
20:00		Report	Ivanovs 10'; Perepļotkins 24'; Rimkus 41'	Stadium: Estadi Comunal; Attendance: 500; Referee: Antonio Rubinos Pérez (Spain)

4 June Friendly	Andorra	1–2	Azerbaijan	Andorra la Vella, Andorra
20:00	Lima 52'	Report	Fábio 17'; Subašić 43'	Stadium: Estadi Comunal; Attendance: 1,000; Referee: Duarte Gomes (Portugal)

20 August 2010 FIFA World Cup qualification	Kazakhstan	3–0	Andorra	Almaty, Kazakhstan
17:00	Ostapenko 14', 30'; Uzdenov 44'	Report		Stadium: Almaty Central Stadium; Attendance: 7,700; Referee: Veaceslav Banari (Moldova)

6 September 2010 FIFA World Cup qualification	Andorra	0–2	England	Barcelona, Spain
20:00		Report	J. Cole 49', 55'	Stadium: Estadi Olímpic Lluís Companys; Attendance: 10,300; Referee: Cüneyt Çakır (Turkey)

10 September 2010 FIFA World Cup qualification	Andorra	1–3	Belarus	Andorra la Vella, Andorra
19:00	Pujol 67' (pen.)	Report	Verkhovtsov 37'; Rodionov 79'; V. Hleb 90'	Stadium: Estadi Comunal; Attendance: 600; Referee: Simon Lee Evans (Wales)

15 October 2010 FIFA World Cup qualification	Croatia	4–0	Andorra	Zagreb, Croatia
20:15	Rakitić 16', 87' (pen.); Olić 32'; Modrić 75'	Report		Stadium: Maksimir Stadium; Attendance: 14,441; Referee: István Vad (Hungary)

=== 2009 ===
11 February Friendly	Andorra	1–3	Lithuania	Albufeira, Portugal
18:15	Lima 78' (pen.)	Report	Velička 44'; Šernas 53'; Kavaliauskas 90+3'	Stadium: Estádio Municipal; Attendance: 100; Referee: Carlos Xistra (Portugal)

1 April 2010 FIFA World Cup qualification	Andorra	0–2	Croatia	Andorra la Vella, Andorra
20:30		Report	Klasnić 15'; Eduardo 35'	Stadium: Estadi Comunal; Attendance: 1,100; Referee: Leontios Trattou (Cyprus)

6 June 2010 FIFA World Cup qualification	Belarus	5–1	Andorra	Grodno, Belarus
19:00	Bliznyuk 2', 76'; Kalachev 44'; Kornilenko 50', 65'	Report	Lima 90+3' (pen.)	Stadium: Neman Stadium; Attendance: 8,500; Referee: Robert Kranjc (Slovenia)

10 June 2010 FIFA World Cup qualification	England	6–0	Andorra	London, England
21:15	Rooney 4', 39'; Lampard 29'; Defoe 73', 76'; Crouch 81'	Report		Stadium: Wembley Stadium; Attendance: 57,897; Referee: Bas Nijhuis (Netherlands)

5 September 2010 FIFA World Cup qualification	Ukraine	5–0	Andorra	Kyiv, Ukraine
16:00	Yarmolenko 18'; Milevskyi 45+2', 90+2' (pen.); Shevchenko 72' (pen.); Seleznyov 90+4' (pen.)	Report		Stadium: Lobanovsky Dynamo Stadium; Attendance: 14,870; Referee: Andrejs Sipailo (Latvia)

9 September 2010 FIFA World Cup qualification	Andorra	1–3	Kazakhstan	Andorra la Vella, Andorra
20:00	Sonejee 70'	Report	Khizhnichenko 14', 35'; Baltiev 29'	Stadium: Estadi Comunal; Attendance: 510; Referee: Albert Toussaint (Luxembourg)

14 October 2010 FIFA World Cup qualification	Andorra	0–6	Ukraine	Andorra la Vella, Andorra
17:30		Report	Shevchenko 22'; Husyev 61'; Lima 69' (o.g.); Rakytskiy 80'; Seleznyov 81'; Yarmolenko 83'	Stadium: Estadi Comunal; Attendance: 820; Referee: Craig Thomson (Scotland)

=== 2010 ===
29 May Friendly	Iceland	4–0	Andorra	Reykjavík, Iceland
18:00	Helguson 32' (pen.), 51'; Gunnarsson 87' (pen.); Sigþórsson 89'	Report		Stadium: Laugardalsvöllur; Attendance: 2,567; Referee: Petur Reinert (Faroe Islands)

2 June Friendly	Albania	1–0	Andorra	Tirana, Albania
20:00	Salihi 44'	Report		Stadium: Qemal Stafa Stadium; Attendance: 3,000; Referee: Dimitar Meckarovski (Macedonia)

11 August Friendly	Cyprus	1–0	Andorra	Larnaca, Cyprus
19:00	Konstantinou 4'	Report		Stadium: Antonis Papadopoulos Stadium; Attendance: 1,700; Referee: Ilias Spathas (Greece)

3 September UEFA Euro 2012 qualifying	Andorra	0–2	Russia	Andorra la Vella, Andorra
18:30		Report	Pogrebnyak 14', 64' (pen.)	Stadium: Estadi Comunal; Attendance: 1,100; Referee: Marco Borg (Malta)

7 September UEFA Euro 2012 qualifying	Republic of Ireland	3–1	Andorra	Dublin, Ireland
20:45	Kilbane 15'; Doyle 41'; Keane 54'	Report	Martínez 45'	Stadium: Landsdowne Road; Attendance: 40,283; Referee: Leontios Trattou (Cyprus)

8 October UEFA Euro 2012 qualifying	Andorra	0–2	Macedonia	Andorra la Vella, Andorra
19:00		Report	Naumoski 42'; Šikov 60'	Stadium: Estadi Comunal; Attendance: 550; Referee: Gediminas Mažeika (Lithuania)

12 October UEFA Euro 2012 qualifying	Armenia	4–0	Andorra	Yerevan, Armenia
17:00	Ghazaryan 4'; Mkhitaryan 16'; Movsisyan 33'; Pizzelli 52'	Report		Stadium: Hanrapetakan Stadium; Attendance: 11,000; Referee: Tomasz Mikulski (Poland)

=== 2011 ===
9 February Friendly	Moldova	2–1	Andorra	Lagos, Portugal
15:00	Picuşceac 66'; Bugaiov 90'	Report	Ayala 52'	Stadium: Estádio Municipal Fernando Cabrita; Attendance: 100; Referee: Sérgio Lopes (Portugal)

26 March UEFA Euro 2012 qualifying	Andorra	0–1	Slovakia	Andorra la Vella, Andorra
20:00		Report	Šebo 21'	Stadium: Estadi Comunal; Attendance: 850; Referee: Menashe Masiah (Israel)

4 June UEFA Euro 2012 qualifying	Slovakia	1–0	Andorra	Bratislava, Slovakia
20:15	Karhan 63'	Report		Stadium: Štadión Pasienky; Attendance: 4,300; Referee: Lorenc Jemini (Albania)

2 September UEFA Euro 2012 qualifying	Andorra	0–3	Armenia	Andorra la Vella, Andorra
18:00		Report	Pizzelli 35'; Ghazaryan 75'; Mkhitaryan 90+1' (pen.)	Stadium: Estadi Comunal; Attendance: 750; Referee: Alexander Kostadinov (Bulgaria)

6 September UEFA Euro 2012 qualifying	Macedonia	1–0	Andorra	Skopje, Macedonia
20:00	Ivanovski 59'	Report		Stadium: Philip II Arena; Attendance: 5,000; Referee: Mark Steven Whitby (Wales)

7 October UEFA Euro 2012 qualifying	Andorra	0–2	Republic of Ireland	Andorra la Vella, Andorra
21:30		Report	Doyle 8'; McGeady 20'	Stadium: Estadi Comunal; Attendance: 860; Referee: Libor Kovařik (Czech Republic)

11 October UEFA Euro 2012 qualifying	Russia	6–0	Andorra	Moscow, Russia
20:45	Dzagoev 5', 44'; Ignashevich 26'; Pavlyuchenko 30'; Glushakov 59'; Bilyaletdinov 78'	Report		Stadium: Luzhniki Stadium; Attendance: 38,790; Referee: Eli Hacmon (Israel)

=== 2012 ===
30 May Friendly	Azerbaijan	0–0	Andorra	Kelsterbach, Germany
17:00		Report		Stadium: Sportpark Kelsterbach; Attendance: 50; Referee: Michael Weiner (Germany)

2 June Friendly	Poland	4–0	Andorra	Warsaw, Poland
17:00	Obraniak 13'; Lewandowski 37'; Błaszczykowski 39' (pen.); Wasilewski 78'	Report		Stadium: Polish Army Stadium; Attendance: 26,000; Referee: Sébastien Delferière (Belgium)

14 August Friendly	Liechtenstein	1–0	Andorra	Vaduz, Liechtenstein
17:00	Hasler 45'	Report		Stadium: Rheinpark Stadion; Attendance: 847; Referee: Stephan Klossner (Switzerland)

7 September 2014 FIFA World Cup qualification	Andorra	0–5	Hungary	Andorra la Vella, Andorra
20:30		Report	Juhász 12'; Gera 33'; Szalai 54'; Priskin 68'; Koman 82'	Stadium: Estadi Comunal; Attendance: 815; Referee: Emir Alecković (Bosnia and Herzegovina)

11 September 2014 FIFA World Cup qualification	Romania	4–0	Andorra	Bucharest, Andorra
19:30	Torje 29'; Lazăr 44'; Găman 90'; Maxim 90+3'	Report		Stadium: Arena Națională; Attendance: 24,630; Referee: Pavle Radovanović (Montenegro)

12 October 2014 FIFA World Cup qualification	Netherlands	3–0	Andorra	Rotterdam, Netherlands
20:30	Van der Vaart 7'; Huntelaar 15'; Schaken 50'	Report		Stadium: De Kuip; Attendance: 43,000; Referee: Aleksei Kulbakov (Belarus)

16 October 2014 FIFA World Cup qualification	Andorra	0–1	Estonia	Andorra la Vella, Andorra
19:00		Report	Oper 57'	Stadium: Estadi Comunal; Attendance: 723; Referee: Dimitar Meckarovski (Macedonia)

14 November Friendly	Andorra	0–2	Iceland	Aixovall, Andorra
19:00		Report	Guðmundsson 10'; Sigurjónsson 58'	Stadium: Camp d’Esports d’Aixovall; Attendance: 500; Referee: Ruddy Buquet (France)

=== 2013 ===
22 March 2014 FIFA World Cup qualification	Andorra	0–2	Turkey	Andorra la Vella, Andorra
19:15		Report	İnan 30'; Yılmaz 45+1'	Stadium: Estadi Comunal; Attendance: 910; Referee: Nerijus Dunauskas (Lithuania)

26 March 2014 FIFA World Cup qualification	Estonia	2–0	Andorra	Tallinn, Estonia
19:00	Anier 45+1'; Lindpere 61'	Report		Stadium: A. Le Coq Arena; Attendance: 5,237; Referee: Ján Valášek (Slovakia)

14 August Friendly	Moldova	1–1	Andorra	Chișinău, Moldova
19:00	Dedov 42'	Report	Sonejee 16'	Stadium: Stadionul Zimbru; Attendance: 4,724; Referee: Yaroslav Kozyk (Ukraine)

6 September 2014 FIFA World Cup qualification	Turkey	5–0	Andorra	Kayseri, Turkey
20:00	Bulut 35', 39', 67'; Yılmaz 64'; Turan 90+2'	Report		Stadium: Kadir Has Stadium; Attendance: 21,923; Referee: Sven Bindels (Luxembourg)

10 September 2014 FIFA World Cup qualification	Andorra	0–2	Netherlands	Andorra la Vella, Andorra
20:30		Report	Van Persie 50', 54'	Stadium: Estadi Comunal; Attendance: 1,100; Referee: Ante Vučemilović-Šimunović Jr. (Croatia)

11 October 2014 FIFA World Cup qualification	Andorra	0–4	Romania	Andorra la Vella, Andorra
20:30		Report	Keserü 43'; Stancu 53'; Torje 63' (pen.); Lazăr 85'	Stadium: Estadi Comunal; Attendance: 1,100; Referee: Stephan Klossner (Switzerland)

15 October 2014 FIFA World Cup qualification	Hungary	2–0	Andorra	Budapest, Hungary
20:00	Nikolić 51'; Lima 76' (o.g.)	Report	5,200	Stadium: Ferenc Puskás Stadion; Attendance: 5,200; Referee: Daniel Stefański (Poland)

=== 2014 ===
5 March Friendly	Andorra	0–3	Moldova	Andorra la Vella, Andorra
19:00		Report	Epureanu 13', 62'; Luvannor 22'	Stadium: Estadi Comunal d'Andorra la Vella; Attendance: 200; Referee: Alan Sant (Malta)

26 March Friendly	Andorra	0–1	Indonesia	Alzira, Spain
15:00		Report	Maitimo 49' (pen.)	Stadium: Estadio Luis Suñer Picó; Attendance: 23; Referee: Fernando Teixeira Vitienes (Spain)

9 September UEFA Euro 2016 qualifying	Andorra	1–2	Wales	Andorra la Vella, Andorra
20:45	Lima 6' (pen.)	Report	Bale 22', 81'	Stadium: Estadi Nacional; Attendance: 3,150; Referee: Slavko Vinčić (Slovenia)

10 October UEFA Euro 2016 qualifying	Belgium	6–0	Andorra	Brussels, Belgium
20:45	De Bruyne 31' (pen.), 34'; Chadli 37'; Origi 59'; Mertens 65', 68'	Report		Stadium: King Baudouin Stadium; Attendance: 45,459; Referee: Serhiy Boyko (Ukraine)

13 October UEFA Euro 2016 qualifying	Andorra	1–4	Israel	Andorra la Vella, Andorra
20:45	Lima 15' (pen.)	Report	Damari 3', 41', 82'; Hemed 90+6' (pen.)	Stadium: Estadi Nacional; Attendance: 2,032; Referee: Cristian Balaj (Romania)

16 November UEFA Euro 2016 qualifying	Cyprus	5–0	Andorra	Nicosia, Cyprus
18:00	Merkis 9'; Efrem 31', 42', 60'; Christofi 87' (pen.)	Report		Stadium: GSP Stadium; Attendance: 6,078; Referee: Mark Clattenburg (England)

=== 2015 ===
28 March UEFA Euro 2016 qualifying	Andorra	0–3	Bosnia and Herzegovina	Andorra la Vella, Andorra
20:45		Report	Džeko 13', 49', 62'	Stadium: Estadi Nacional; Attendance: 2,498; Referee: István Vad (Hungary)

6 June Friendly	Andorra	0–1	Equatorial Guinea	Andorra la Vella, Andorra
16:00		Report	Igor 17'	Stadium: Estadi Comunal; Attendance: 175; Referee: Javier Estrada Fernández (Spain)

12 June UEFA Euro 2016 qualifying	Andorra	1–3	Cyprus	Andorra la Vella, Andorra
20:45	Dossa Júnior 2' (o.g.)	Report	Mitidis 13', 45', 53'	Stadium: Estadi Nacional; Attendance: 1,054; Referee: Tobias Welz (Germany)

3 October UEFA Euro 2016 qualifying	Israel	4–0	Andorra	Haifa, Israel
20:45	Zahavi 3'; Bitton 22'; Hemed 26' (pen.); Dabour 38'	Report		Stadium: Sammy Ofer Stadium; Attendance: 22,650; Referee: Tamás Bognár (Hungary)

6 October UEFA Euro 2016 qualifying	Bosnia and Herzegovina	3–0	Andorra	Zenica, Bosnia and Herzegovina
20:45	Bičakčić 14'; Džeko 30'; Lulić 45'	Report		Stadium: Bilino Polje; Attendance: 6,830; Referee: Arnold Hunter (Northern Ireland)

10 October UEFA Euro 2016 qualifying	Andorra	1–4	Belgium	Andorra la Vella, Andorra
20:45	Lima 51' (pen.)	Report	Nainggolan 19'; De Bruyne 42'; Hazard 56' (pen.); Depoitre 64'	Stadium: Estadi Nacional; Attendance: 3,032; Referee: Paweł Gil (Poland)

13 October UEFA Euro 2016 qualifying	Wales	2–0	Andorra	Cardiff, Wales
20:45	Ramsey 50'; Bale 86'	Report		Stadium: Cardiff City Stadium; Attendance: 33,280; Referee: Kevin Blom (Netherlands)

12 November Friendly	Andorra	0–1	Saint Kitts and Nevis	Andorra la Vella, Andorra
19:00		Report	Elliott 9'	Stadium: Estadi Comunal; Referee: Adrian Azzopardi (Malta)

=== 2016 ===
28 March Friendly	Andorra	0–1	Moldova	Ta' Qali, Malta
17:00		Report	Armaș 45+2'	Stadium: Ta' Qali National Stadium; Attendance: 50; Referee: Johnny Casanova (San Marino)

26 May Friendly	Azerbaijan	0–0	Andorra	Bad Erlach, Austria
18:00		Report		Stadium: Sportplatz Bad Erlach; Attendance: 300; Referee: Harald Lechner (Austria)

1 June Friendly	Estonia	2–0	Andorra	Tallinn, Estonia
18:00	Kruglov 24'; Liivak 90+3'	Report		Stadium: Lilleküla Stadium; Attendance: 4,658; Referee: Sergejus Slyva (Lithuania)

6 September 2018 FIFA World Cup qualification	Andorra	0–1	Latvia	Andorra la Vella, Andorra
20:45		Report (FIFA); Report (UEFA)	Šabala 48'	Stadium: Estadi Nacional; Attendance: 1,115; Referee: Clayton Pisani (Malta)

7 October 2018 FIFA World Cup qualification	Portugal	6–0	Andorra	Aveiro, Portugal
20:45	Ronaldo 2', 4', 47', 68'; Cancelo 44'; A. Silva 86'	Report (FIFA); Report (UEFA)		Stadium: Estádio Municipal; Attendance: 25,120; Referee: Oliver Drachta (Austria)

10 October 2018 FIFA World Cup qualification	Andorra	1–2	Switzerland	Andorra la Vella, Andorra
20:45	A. Martínez 90+1'	Report (FIFA); Report (UEFA)	Schär 19' (pen.); Mehmedi 77'	Stadium: Estadi Nacional; Attendance: 2,014; Referee: John Beaton (Scotland)

13 November 2018 FIFA World Cup qualification	Hungary	4–0	Andorra	Budapest, Hungary
18:00	Gera 34'; Lang 43'; Gyurcsó 73'; Szalai 88'	Report (FIFA); Report (UEFA)		Stadium: Groupama Arena; Attendance: 20,479; Referee: Christos Nicolaides (Cyprus)

=== 2017 ===
22 February Friendly	San Marino	0–2	Andorra	Serravalle, San Marino
18:30		Report	Lima 28' (pen.); Martínez 67'	Stadium: San Marino Stadium; Attendance: 60; Referee: Massimiliano Irrati (Italy)

25 March 2018 FIFA World Cup qualification	Andorra	0–0	Faroe Islands	Andorra la Vella, Andorra
18:00		Report (FIFA); Report (UEFA)		Stadium: Estadi Nacional; Attendance: 1,890; Referee: Ognjen Valjić (Bosnia and Herzegovina)

9 June 2018 FIFA World Cup qualification	Andorra	1–0	Hungary	Andorra la Vella, Andorra
20:45	Rebés 26'	Report (FIFA); Report (UEFA)		Stadium: Estadi Nacional; Attendance: 2,407; Referee: Charalambos Kalogeropoulos (Greece)

16 August Friendly	Qatar	1–0	Andorra	Burton upon Trent, England
19:00	Assadalla 73'			Stadium: St George's Park; Referee: Craig Pawson (England)

31 August 2018 FIFA World Cup qualification	Switzerland	3–0	Andorra	St. Gallen, Switzerland
20:45	Seferovic 43', 63'; Lichtsteiner 67'	Report (FIFA); Report (UEFA)		Stadium: kybunpark Attendance: 13,600; Referee: Tore Hansen (Norway)

3 September 2018 FIFA World Cup qualification	Faroe Islands	1–0	Andorra	Tórshavn, Faroe Islands
18:00	Rólantsson 32'	Report (FIFA); Report (UEFA)		Stadium: Tórsvøllur; Attendance: 4,357; Referee: Alan Mario Sant (Malta)

7 October 2018 FIFA World Cup qualification	Andorra	0–2	Portugal	Andorra la Vella, Andorra
20:45		Report (FIFA); Report (UEFA)	Ronaldo 63'; A. Silva 86'	Stadium: Estadi Nacional; Attendance: 3,193; Referee: Miroslav Zelinka (Czech Republic)

10 October 2018 FIFA World Cup qualification	Latvia	4–0	Andorra	Riga, Latvia
20:45	Ikaunieks 11'; Šabala 19', 59'; Tarasovs 63'	Report (FIFA); Report (UEFA)		Stadium: Skonto Stadium; Attendance: 4,153; Referee: Mads-Kristoffer Kristoffersen (Denmark)

=== 2018 ===
21 March Friendly	Liechtenstein	0–1	Andorra	La Línea de la Concepción, Spain
18:00		Report	Rebés 6'	Stadium: Estadio Municipal; Attendance: 200; Referee: Rohit Saggi (Norway)

3 June Friendly	Cape Verde	0–0	Andorra	Almada, Portugal
17:00		Report		Stadium: Estádio Municipal José Martins Vieira; Attendance: 500; Referee: Fábio Veríssimo (Portugal)

18 August Friendly	United Arab Emirates	0–0	Andorra	Grödig, Austria
18:00		Report		Stadium: DAS.GOLDBERG Stadion; Referee: Christopher Jäger (Austria)

6 September 2018 UEFA Nations League	Latvia	0–0	Andorra	Riga, Latvia
20:45		Report		Stadium: Daugava Stadium; Attendance: 4,803; Referee: Keith Kennedy (Northern Ireland)

10 September 2018 UEFA Nations League	Andorra	1–1	Kazakhstan	Andorra la Vella, Andorra
20:45	Aláez 86'	Report	Logvinenko 68'	Stadium: Estadi Nacional; Attendance: 1,235; Referee: Vilhjálmur Þórarinsson (Iceland)

13 October 2018 UEFA Nations League	Georgia	3–0	Andorra	Tbilisi, Georgia
18:00	Qazaishvili 33', 84'; Kankava 90+5'	Report		Stadium: Boris Paichadze Dinamo Arena; Attendance: 30,000; Referee: Leontios Trattou (Cyprus)

16 October 2018 UEFA Nations League	Kazakhstan	4–0	Andorra	Astana, Kazakhstan
16:00	Seydakhmet 21'; Turysbek 39'; Gómes 61' (o.g.); Murtazayev 74'	Report		Stadium: Astana Arena; Attendance: 19,854; Referee: Serhiy Boyko (Ukraine)

15 November 2018 UEFA Nations League	Andorra	1–1	Georgia	Andorra la Vella, Andorra
20:45	C. Martínez 63'	Report	Chakvetadze 9'	Stadium: Estadi Nacional; Attendance: 1,311; Referee: Radu Petrescu (Romania)

19 November 2018 UEFA Nations League	Andorra	0–0	Latvia	Andorra la Vella, Andorra
18:00		Report		Stadium: Estadi Nacional; Attendance: 1,021; Referee: Halil Umut Meler (Turkey)

=== 2019 ===
22 March UEFA Euro 2020 qualifying	Andorra	0–2	Iceland	Andorra la Vella, Andorra
20:45		Report	B. Bjarnason 22'; Kjartansson 80'	Stadium: Estadi Nacional; Attendance: 1,854; Referee: Sandro Schärer (Switzerland)

25 March UEFA Euro 2020 qualifying	Andorra	0–3	Albania	Andorra la Vella, Andorra
20:45		Report	Sadiku 21'; Balaj 87'; Abrashi 90+6'	Stadium: Estadi Nacional; Attendance: 1,373; Referee: Filip Glova (Slovakia)

8 June UEFA Euro 2020 qualifying	Moldova	1–0	Andorra	Chișinău, Moldova
18:00	Armaș 8'	Report		Stadium: Zimbru Stadium; Attendance: 5,000; Referee: Bojan Pandžić (Sweden)

11 June UEFA Euro 2020 qualifying	Andorra	0–4	France	Andorra la Vella, Andorra
20:45		Report	Mbappé 11'; Ben Yedder 30'; Thauvin 45+1'; Zouma 60'	Stadium: Estadi Nacional; Attendance: 3,187; Referee: Fran Jović (Croatia)

7 September UEFA Euro 2020 qualifying	Turkey	1–0	Andorra	Istanbul, Turkey
20:45	Tufan 89'	Report		Stadium: Vodafone Park; Attendance: 40,000; Referee: Donald Robertson (Scotland)

10 September UEFA Euro 2020 qualifying	France	3–0	Andorra	Saint-Denis, France
20:45	Coman 18'; Lenglet 52'; Ben Yedder 90+1'	Report		Stadium: Stade de France; Attendance: 55,383; Referee: Mykola Balakin (Ukraine)

11 October UEFA Euro 2020 qualifying	Andorra	1–0	Moldova	Andorra la Vella, Andorra
20:45	Vales 63'	Report		Stadium: Estadi Nacional; Attendance: 947; Referee: Jonathan Lardot (Belgium)

14 October UEFA Euro 2020 qualifying	Iceland	2–0	Andorra	Reykjavík, Iceland
20:45	A. Sigurðsson 38'; Sigþórsson 65'	Report		Stadium: Laugardalsvöllur; Attendance: 7,981; Referee: Tamás Bognár (Hungary)

14 November UEFA Euro 2020 qualifying	Albania	2–2	Andorra	Elbasan, Albania
20:45	Balaj 6'; Manaj 55'	Report	C. Martínez 18', 48'	Stadium: Elbasan Arena; Attendance: 4,260; Referee: Kristo Tohver (Estonia)

17 November UEFA Euro 2020 qualifying	Andorra	0–2	Turkey	Andorra la Vella, Andorra
20:45		Report	Ünal 17', 21' (pen.)	Stadium: Estadi Nacional; Attendance: 2,357; Referee: Ivan Kružliak (Slovakia)

== See also ==
- Andorra national football team results (2020–present)
