= Andorra national football team records and statistics =

The following tables show the Andorra national football team's all-time international record. The statistics are composed of FIFA World Cup, UEFA European Football Championship, UEFA Nations League, as well as numerous international friendly tournaments and matches.

== Performances ==
Last match updated was against Gibraltar on 27 September 2026

=== Performance by competition ===
Competition	Played	Won	Drawn	Lost	For	Against	Diff
FIFA World Cup qualification	70	4	4	62	25	202	–177
UEFA European Championship qualification	71	1	3	67	17	193	–176
UEFA Nations League	24	2	10	12	10	34	–24
International Friendlies	67	7	16	44	24	117	–93
Total	230	14	33	183	76	542	–466

== Individual records ==
=== Player records ===
- First goal scored: - Agusti Pol - v Estonia, 13 November 1996
- Most appearances: 137 - Ildefons Lima - 1997-2023
- Most consecutive appearances: 46 - Koldo Álvarez - from 9 September 2001 to 4 June 2008
- Most appearances by a goalkeeper: 88 - Josep Gómes - 2006-present
- Top goalscorer: 11 - Ildefons Lima - 1997-2023
- Most goals in one calendar year: 4 - Marc Vales - 2021
- Longest Andorra player career: 26 years - (2 times)
  - Ildefons Lima - 1997-2023 (World records)
  - Marc Pujol - 2000-2026 (World records)
- Most goals in a match: 2 - (2 times)
  - Cristian Martínez (Andorran footballer) - v Albania, 14 November 2019
  - Marc Vales - v San Marino, 2 September 2021
- Most goals in first half: 2 - Marc Vales - v San Marino, 2 September 2021
- Most goals in second half: 1 - (45 times)
- Most penalty kick goals: 6 - Ildefons Lima - 1997-2023
- Andorra penalty kick goals: - (15 times)
  - Jesús Lucendo - v Armenia, 5 September 1998
  - Justo Ruiz - v Russia, 8 September 1999
  - Justo Ruiz - v Estonia, 7 October 2000
  - Emiliano González (footballer) - v Albania, 14 April 2002
  - Marc Pujol - v Romania, 8 September 2004
  - Marc Pujol - v Belarus, 10 September 2008
  - Ildefons Lima - v Lithuania, 11 February 2009
  - Ildefons Lima - v Belarus, 6 June 2009
  - Ildefons Lima - v Wales, 9 September 2014
  - Ildefons Lima - v Israel, 13 October 2014
  - Ildefons Lima - v Belgium, 10 October 2015
  - Ildefons Lima - v San Marino, 22 February 2017
  - Marc Pujol - v Hungary, 31 March 2021
  - Jordi Aláez - v Liechtenstein, 10 June 2022
  - Jordi Aláez - v Liechtenstein, 4 June 2026
- Fastest goals scored: 2nd minute - (2 times)
  - Óscar Sonejee - v Malta, 8 February 2000
  - Dossa Júnior - v Cyprus, 12 June 2015 (own goal)
- Fastest goals conceded: 1st minute - (2 times)
  - 19 seconds - Luís Figo - v Portugal, 28 February 2001
  - Florin Cernat - v Romania, 8 September 2004
- Most red cards: 4 - Toni Lima - 1997-2009
- Fastest red cards: 20 seconds - Ricard Fernandez - v Poland, 12 November 2021
- Andorra player sent off: - (25 times)
  - Juli Sánchez - v Azerbaijan, 24 June 1998 (65th minute)
  - Toni Lima - v France, 9 June 1999 (86th minute)
  - Toni Lima - v Estonia, 7 October 2000 (90th minute)
  - Toni Lima - v Iceland, 21 August 2002 (50th minute)
  - Toni Lima - v Bulgaria, 16 October 2002 (83rd minute)
  - Justo Ruiz - v Estonia, 7 June 2003 (90th minute)
  - Francesc Ramirez - v Bulgaria, 10 September 2003 (86th minute)
  - Ildefons Lima - v Romania, 8 September 2004 (80th minute)
  - Justo Ruiz - v Czech Republic, 4 June 2005 (63rd minute)
  - Ildefons Lima - v Armenia, 12 October 2005 (44th minute)
  - Fernando Silva (footballer, born 1977) - v Israel, 6 September 2006 (77th minute)
  - Antoni Sivera - v North Macedonia, 11 October 2006 (26th minute)
  - Ildefons Lima - v Armenia, 2 September 2011 (90th minute)
  - Marc Vales - v Hungary, 7 September 2012 (67th minute)
  - Moisés San Nicolás - v Hungary, 15 October 2013 (88th minute)
  - Víctor Rodríguez (Andorran footballer) - v Bosnia and Herzegovina, 6 September 2015 (63rd minute) (chewing gum)
  - Jordi Rubio and Marc Rebés - v Portugal, 7 October 2016 (62nd and 71st minute)
  - Josep Ayala - v Estonia, 1 June 2016 (86th minute)
  - Sergi Moreno - v Qatar, 16 August 2017 (90th minute)
  - Christian Garcia - v Latvia, 17 November 2020 (90th minute)
  - Ricard Fernandez - v Poland, 12 November 2021 (20 seconds)
  - Marc Rebés - v Romania, 25 March 2023 (61st minute)
  - Moisés San Nicolás - v Romania, 15 October 2023 (91st minute)
  - Joel Guillén - v Latvia, 11 October 2025 (92nd minute)

=== Manager records ===
- Most appearances: 142 - Koldo Álvarez - 2010-present
- Most matches lost: 107 - Koldo Álvarez - 2010-present

== Team records ==
- Most consecutive failed qualification attempts FIFA World Cup: 7 - 2002-present
- Most consecutive failed qualification attempts UEFA European Championship: 7 - 2000-present
- Most goals in a FIFA World Cup qualification: 8 - 2022
- Fewest goals in a FIFA World Cup qualification: 0 - 2014
- Most goals conceded in a FIFA World Cup qualification: 39 - 2010
- Fewest goals conceded in a FIFA World Cup qualification: 16 - 2022
- Most points in a FIFA World Cup qualification: 6 - 2022
- Fewest points in a FIFA World Cup qualification: 0 - 2002, 2010 and 2014
- Most goals in a UEFA European Championship qualification: 4 - 2016
- Fewest goals in a UEFA European Championship qualification: 18 - 2004
- Most goals conceded in a UEFA European Championship qualification: 42 - 2008
- Fewest goals conceded in a UEFA European Championship qualification: 1 - 2004 and 2012
- Most points in a UEFA European Championship qualification: 4 - 2020
- Fewest points in a UEFA European Championship qualification: 0 - 2000, 2004, 2008, 2012 and 2016
- Most matches played two meeting: 13 - (2 times)
  - v Latvia, 1997-present
  - v Estonia, 1996-present
- Biggest win: 3 - v San Marino, 12 October 2021
- Biggest defeat: 7 - (3 times)
  - v Czech Republic, 4 June 2005
  - v Croatia, 7 October 2006
  - v Portugal, 11 November 2020
- Most goals in a match: 3 - v San Marino, 12 October 2021
- Most goals in first half: 2 - (2 times)
  - v San Marino, 2 September 2021
  - v San Marino, 13 October 2024
- Most goals in second half: 2 - (2 times)
  - v San Marino, 12 October 2021
  - v Liechtenstein, 4 June 2026
- Most goals conceded in a match: 8 - v Czech Republic, 4 June 2005
- Most goals conceded in first half: 5 - v Portugal, 1 September 2001
- Most goals conceded in second half: 5 - (5 times)
  - v Estonia, 13 November 1996
  - v Czech Republic, 4 June 2005
  - v Croatia, 7 October 2006
  - v Ukraine, 14 October 2009
  - v Portugal, 11 November 2020
- Most goals by both teams in a match: 9 - v Czech Republic, 4 June 2005
- Most goals by both teams in first half: 6 - v Portugal, 1 September 2001
- Fewest goals by both teams in a match: 0 - (22 times)
  - v Azerbaijan, 24 June 1998
  - v Faroe Islands, 3 March 1999
  - v Azerbaijan, 10 February 2000
  - v China, 14 April 2004
  - v Macedonia, 9 February 2005
  - v Finland, 3 September 2005
  - v Armenia, 7 February 2007
  - v Azerbaijan, 30 May 2012
  - v Azerbaijan, 26 May 2016
  - v Faroe Islands, 27 March 2017
  - v Cape Verde, 3 June 2018
  - v United Arab Emirates, 18 August 2018
  - v Latvia, 6 September 2018
  - v Latvia, 19 November 2018
  - v Latvia, 3 September 2020
  - v Armenia, 10 October 2020
  - v Gibraltar, 7 June 2021
  - v Moldova, 6 June 2022
  - v Belarus, 9 September 2023
  - v Malta, 19 November 2024
  - v Estonia, 9 September 2025
  - v San Marino, 31 March 2026
- Longest losing streak: 35 - from 28 March 2007 to 11 October 2011
- Longest winless streak: 86 - from 17 November 2004 to 13 November 2016
- Longest winning streak: 2 - from 25 March 2022 to 28 March 2022
- Longest draw streak: 4 - from 3 June 2018 to 10 September 2018
- Longest goalless streak: 16 - from 26 March 2011 to 26 March 2013
- Longest goalless streak by minute: 1,494 minutes - from 9 February 2011 to 14 August 2013
- Longest clean sheet streak: 4 - from 21 March 2018 to 6 September 2018
- Longest clean sheet streak by minute: 454 minutes - from 10 October 2017 to 10 September 2018
- Longest goalless streak by both teams: 422 minutes - from 21 March 2018 to 10 September 2018
- Fastest 2 goals scored to start the match: 24th minute - v San Marino, 2 September 2021
- Fastest 2 goals scored: 6 minute - v San Marino, 2 September 2021
- Fastest 2 goals conceded to start the match: 4th minutes - v Portugal, 7 October 2016 (Fastest Cristiano Ronaldo goal is 2nd minutes)
- Fastest 2 goals conceded: 0 minutes - v Portugal, 1 September 2001
- Fastest 3 goals conceded to start the match: 17th minute - v Romania, 8 September 2004

== Competition records ==
Key
Champions
Runners-up
Third place
Fourth place

=== FIFA World Cup ===
FIFA World Cup finals record										Qualification record					
Year	Round	Pos	Pld	W	D*	L	GF	GA	Squad	Pld	W	D	L	GF	GA
(Uruguay) 1930	Not a FIFA member									Not a FIFA member					
(Italy) 1934	Not a FIFA member									Not a FIFA member					
(France) 1938	Not a FIFA member									Not a FIFA member					
(Brazil) 1950	Not a FIFA member									Not a FIFA member					
(Switzerland) 1954	Not a FIFA member									Not a FIFA member					
(Sweden) 1958	Not a FIFA member									Not a FIFA member					
(Chile) 1962	Not a FIFA member									Not a FIFA member					
(England) 1966	Not a FIFA member									Not a FIFA member					
(Mexico) 1970	Not a FIFA member									Not a FIFA member					
(West Germany) 1974	Not a FIFA member									Not a FIFA member					
(Argentina) 1978	Not a FIFA member									Not a FIFA member					
(Spain) 1982	Not a FIFA member									Not a FIFA member					
(Mexico) 1986	Not a FIFA member									Not a FIFA member					
(Italy) 1994	Not a FIFA member									Not a FIFA member					
(United States) 1994	Not a FIFA member									Not a FIFA member					
(France) 1998	Not a FIFA member									Not a FIFA member					
(South Korea) (Japan) 2002	Did not qualify									10	0	0	10	5	36
(Germany) 2006	Did not qualify									12	1	2	9	4	34
(South Africa) 2010	Did not qualify									10	0	0	10	3	39
(Brazil) 2014	Did not qualify									10	0	0	10	0	30
(Russia) 2018	Did not qualify									10	1	1	8	2	23
(Qatar) 2022	Did not qualify									10	2	0	8	8	24
(Canada) (Mexico) (United States) 2026	To be determined									To be determined					
Total	0 titles	0/22	0	0	0	0	0	0	—	62	4	3	55	22	186
Champions Runners-up Third place Fourth place *Draws include knockout matches decided via penalty shoot-out.

== Head-to-head record ==
As of 4 October 2026

Key
Positive balance (more Wins)
Neutral balance (Wins = Losses)
Negative balance (more Losses)

Opponent	Played	Won	Drawn	Lost	For	Against	Diff
Albania	9	1	1	7	4	15	–11
Armenia	8	0	1	7	2	20	–18
Austria	1	0	0	1	0	1	–1
Azerbaijan	5	0	4	1	1	2	–1
Belarus	6	1	1	4	4	12	–8
Belgium	4	0	0	4	1	14	–13
Bosnia and Herzegovina	2	0	0	2	0	6	–6
Brazil	1	0	0	1	0	3	–3
Bulgaria	2	0	0	2	1	5	–4
Bolivia	1	0	0	1	0	1	–1
Cape Verde	2	0	1	1	1	2	–1
China	1	0	1	0	0	0	0
Croatia	6	0	0	6	0	24	–24
Cyprus	5	0	0	5	3	17	–14
Czech Republic	3	0	0	3	1	13	–12
England	8	0	0	8	0	28	–28
Equatorial Guinea	1	0	0	1	0	1	–1
Estonia	13	0	1	12	5	28	–23
Faroe Islands	5	0	2	3	0	4	–4
Finland	3	0	1	2	0	7	–7
France	5	0	0	5	0	14	–14
Gabon	1	0	0	1	0	2	–2
Georgia	2	0	1	1	1	4	–3
Gibraltar	4	0	2	2	0	2	–2
Grenada	1	1	0	0	1	0	+1
Hungary	6	1	0	5	3	17	–14
Iceland	7	0	0	7	0	18	–18
Indonesia	1	0	0	1	0	1	–1
Iraq	1	0	0	1	0	1	–1
Israel	6	0	0	6	3	18	–15
Kazakhstan	4	0	1	3	2	11	–9
Kosovo	3	0	1	2	1	7	–6
Latvia	13	0	5	8	4	26	–22
Liechtenstein	5	4	0	1	7	2	+5
Lithuania	3	0	0	3	1	10	–9
Malta	8	0	4	4	4	9	–5
Montenegro	1	0	0	1	0	2	–2
Moldova	10	1	2	7	3	14	–11
Netherlands	6	0	0	6	0	21	–21
North Macedonia	6	1	1	4	1	9	–8
Northern Ireland	1	0	0	1	0	2	–2
Poland	3	0	0	3	1	11	–10
Portugal	6	0	0	6	1	29	–28
Qatar	1	0	0	1	0	1	–1
Republic of Ireland	5	0	0	5	3	15	–12
Romania	6	0	0	6	1	21	–20
Russia	6	0	0	6	2	21	–19
San Marino	5	4	1	0	9	0	+9
Serbia	2	0	0	2	1	6	–5
Slovakia	2	0	0	2	0	2	–2
South Africa	1	0	1	0	1	1	0
Spain	2	0	0	2	0	9	–9
Saint Kitts and Nevis	2	1	0	1	1	1	0
Switzerland	4	0	0	4	2	10	–8
Turkey	4	0	0	4	0	10	–10
United Arab Emirates	1	0	1	0	0	0	0
Ukraine	4	0	0	4	0	17	–17
Wales	2	0	0	2	1	4	–3
Total	236	14	33	189	77	551	–474
