= UEFA Euro 2000 qualifying Group 4 =

Football tournament qualification stage

Standings and results for Group 4 of the UEFA Euro 2000 qualifying tournament.

== Standings ==
Pos	Team	Pld	W	D	L	GF	GA	GD	Pts	Qualification	(France)	(Ukraine)	(Russia)	(Iceland)	(Armenia)	(Andorra)
1	France	10	6	3	1	17	10	+7	21	Qualify for final tournament	—	0–0	2–3	3–2	2–0	2–0
2	Ukraine	10	5	5	0	14	4	+10	20	Advance to play-offs	0–0	—	3–2	1–1	2–0	4–0
3	Russia	10	6	1	3	22	12	+10	19		2–3	1–1	—	1–0	2–0	6–1
4	Iceland	10	4	3	3	12	7	+5	15		1–1	0–1	1–0	—	2–0	3–0
5	Armenia	10	2	2	6	8	15	−7	8		2–3	0–0	0–3	0–0	—	3–1
6	Andorra	10	0	0	10	3	28	−25	0		0–1	0–2	1–2	0–2	0–3	—

Source: UEFA
Rules for classification: Qualification tiebreakers

== Matches ==
5 September 1998
18:00 UTC+05:00

Armenia	3–1	Andorra
Avalyan 40'; Yesayan 71', 90'	Report	Lucendo 85' (pen.)

Hrazdan Stadium, Yerevan
Attendance: 8,000
Referee: Richard O'Hanlon (Republic of Ireland)
5 September 1998
18:45 UTC

Iceland	1–1	France
Daðason 32'	Report	Dugarry 35'

Laugardalsvöllur, Reykjavík
Attendance: 10,382
Referee: Eric Blareau (Belgium)
5 September 1998
19:00 UTC+03:00

Ukraine	3–2	Russia
Popov 14'; Skachenko 24'; Rebrov 74' (pen.)	Report	Varlamov 67'; Onopko 88'

Olimpiysky NSC, Kyiv
Attendance: 82,100
Referee: Markus Merk (Germany)

10 October 1998
18:00 UTC+02:00

Andorra	0–2	Ukraine
	Report	Kosovskyi 32'; Rebrov 44'

Estadi Comunal d'Andorra la Vella, Andorra la Vella
Attendance: 850
Referee: Anton Guetzov (Bulgaria)
10 October 1998
18:00 UTC+05:00

Armenia	0–0	Iceland
	Report

Hrazdan Stadium, Yerevan
Attendance: 6,000
Referee: Morgan Norman (Sweden)
10 October 1998
20:00 UTC+04:00

Russia	2–3	France
Yanovsky 45'; Mostovoi 55'	Report	Anelka 13'; Pires 28'; Boghossian 81'

Luzhniki Stadium, Moscow
Attendance: 20,989
Referee: Piero Ceccarini (Italy)

14 October 1998
20:45 UTC+02:00

France	2–0	Andorra
Candela 54'; Djorkaeff 59'	Report

Stade de France, Saint-Denis
Attendance: 75,416
Referee: Dani Koren (Israel)
14 October 1998
17:45 UTC

Iceland	1–0	Russia
Kovtun 87' (o.g.)	Report

Laugardalsvöllur, Reykjavík
Attendance: 3,345
Referee: René Temmink (Netherlands)
14 October 1998
19:00 UTC+03:00

Ukraine	2–0	Armenia
Skachenko 31'; Husin 80'	Report

Olimpiysky NSC, Kyiv
Attendance: 14,850
Referee: Marcel Lică (Romania)

27 March 1999
19:00 UTC+01:00

Andorra	0–2	Iceland
	Report	E. Sverrisson 58'; Adolfsson 67'

Estadi Comunal d'Andorra la Vella, Andorra la Vella
Attendance: 900
Referee: Charles Agius (Malta)
27 March 1999
20:00 UTC+04:00

Armenia	0–3	Russia
	Report	Karpin 7', 63' (pen.); Beschastnykh 89'

Hrazdan Stadium, Yerevan
Attendance: 10,000
Referee: Terje Hauge (Norway)
27 March 1999
20:00 UTC+01:00

France	0–0	Ukraine
	Report

Stade de France, Saint-Denis
Attendance: 78,519
Referee: Günter Benkö (Austria)

31 March 1999
20:45 UTC+02:00

France	2–0	Armenia
Wiltord 3'; Dugarry 45'	Report

Stade de France, Saint-Denis
Attendance: 78,852
Referee: Georgios Bikas (Greece)
31 March 1999
19:00 UTC+04:00

Russia	6–1	Andorra
Titov 8'; Beschastnykh 11', 62'; Onopko 42'; Tsymbalar 50'; Alenichev 90'	Report	Juli Sánchez 73'

Central Stadium Lokomotiv, Moscow
Attendance: 10,333
Referee: Mikko Vuorela (Finland)
31 March 1999
19:00 UTC+03:00

Ukraine	1–1	Iceland
Vashchuk 59'	Report	L.Sigurðsson 66'

Olimpiysky NSC, Kyiv
Attendance: 40,000
Referee: Dani Koren (Israel)

5 June 1999
20:45 UTC+02:00

France	2–3	Russia
Petit 48'; Wiltord 54'	Report	Panov 40', 75'; Karpin 87'

Stade de France, Saint-Denis
Attendance: 78,228
Referee: Paul Durkin (England)
5 June 1999
16:00 UTC

Iceland	2–0	Armenia
Daðason 30'; R. Kristinsson 46'	Report

Laugardalsvöllur, Reykjavík
Attendance: 5,565
Referee: Mikko Vuorela (Finland)
5 June 1999
19:00 UTC+03:00

Ukraine	4–0	Andorra
Popov 38'; Rebrov 41'; Dmytrulin 56'; Husin 89'	Report

Olimpiysky NSC, Kyiv
Attendance: 51,000
Referee: Andreas Georgiou (Cyprus)

9 June 1999
20:45 UTC+02:00

Andorra	0–1	France
	Report	Leboeuf 86' (pen.)

Estadi Olímpic de Montjuïc, Barcelona, Spain
Attendance: 7,600
Referee: Michael Ross (Northern Ireland)
9 June 1999
19:00 UTC+05:00

Armenia	0–0	Ukraine
	Report

Hrazdan Stadium, Yerevan
Attendance: 15,000
Referee: Roberto Boggi (Italy)
9 June 1999
19:00 UTC+04:00

Russia	1–0	Iceland
Karpin 44'	Report

Dynamo Stadium, Moscow
Attendance: 33,900
Referee: Metin Tokat (Turkey)

4 September 1999
16:00 UTC

Iceland	3–0	Andorra
Þ.Guðjónsson 29'; Hreiðarsson 32'; E.Guðjohnsen 90'	Report

Laugardalsvöllur, Reykjavík
Attendance: 5,210
Referee: Miroslav Liba (Czech Republic)
4 September 1999
19:00 UTC+04:00

Russia	2–0	Armenia
Beschastnykh 8' (pen.); Karpin 70'	Report

Luzhniki Stadium, Moscow
Attendance: 36,000
Referee: Charles Agius (Malta)
4 September 1999
19:00 UTC+03:00

Ukraine	0–0	France
	Report

Olimpiysky NSC, Kyiv
Attendance: 78,000
Referee: Hugh Dallas (Scotland)

8 September 1999
18:30 UTC+02:00

Andorra	1–2	Russia
Justo Ruiz 39' (pen.)	Report	Onopko 22', 57'

Estadi Comunal d'Andorra la Vella, Andorra la Vella
Attendance: 1,000
Referee: Jørn Larsen (Denmark)
8 September 1999
18:00 UTC

Iceland	0–1	Ukraine
	Report	Rebrov 43' (pen.)

Laugardalsvöllur, Reykjavík
Attendance: 7,072
Referee: Vítor Melo Pereira (Portugal)
8 September 1999
21:00 UTC+05:00

Armenia	2–3	France
Mikaelyan 6'; Shahgeldyan 90' (pen.)	Report	Djorkaeff 45' (pen.); Zidane 67'; Laslandes 74'

Hrazdan Stadium, Yerevan
Attendance: 14,500
Referee: Atanas Uzunov (Bulgaria)

9 October 1999
16:00 UTC+02:00

Andorra	0–3	Armenia
	Report	A.Petrosyan 26'; Yesayan 59'; Shahgeldyan 63'

Estadi Comunal d'Andorra la Vella, Andorra la Vella
Attendance: 900
Referee: Peter Jones (England)
9 October 1999
18:00 UTC+02:00

France	3–2	Iceland
Daðason 17' (o.g.); Djorkaeff 38'; Trezeguet 71'	Report	E.Sverrisson 47'; Gunnarsson 56'

Stade de France, Saint-Denis
Attendance: 78,391
Referee: Bernd Heynemann (Germany)
9 October 1999
20:00 MDT

Russia	1–1	Ukraine
Karpin 75'	Report	Shevchenko 88'

Luzhniki Stadium, Moscow
Attendance: 78,600
Referee: David Elleray (England)

== Goalscorers ==
There were 76 goals scored in 30 matches, for an average of 2.53 goals per match.

6 goals

- (Russia national football team) Valeri Karpin

4 goals

- (Russia national football team) Vladimir Beschastnykh
- (Russia national football team) Viktor Onopko
- (Ukraine national football team) Serhiy Rebrov

3 goals

- (Armenia national football team) Tigran Yesayan
- (France national football team) Youri Djorkaeff

2 goals

- (Armenia national football team) Armen Shahgeldyan
- (France national football team) Christophe Dugarry
- (France national football team) Sylvain Wiltord
- (Iceland national football team) Ríkharður Daðason
- (Iceland national football team) Eyjólfur Sverrisson
- (Russia national football team) Aleksandr Panov
- (Ukraine national football team) Andriy Husin
- (Ukraine national football team) Serhiy Popov
- (Ukraine national football team) Serhiy Skachenko

1 goal

- (Andorra national football team) Jesús Julián Lucendo
- (Andorra national football team) Justo Ruiz
- (Andorra national football team) Juli Sánchez
- (Armenia national football team) Garnik Avalyan
- (Armenia national football team) Karapet Mikaelyan
- (Armenia national football team) Artur Petrosyan
- (France national football team) Nicolas Anelka
- (France national football team) Alain Boghossian
- (France national football team) Vincent Candela
- (France national football team) Lilian Laslandes
- (France national football team) Frank Leboeuf
- (France national football team) Emmanuel Petit
- (France national football team) Robert Pires
- (France national football team) David Trezeguet
- (France national football team) Zinedine Zidane
- (Iceland national football team) Steinar Dagur Adolfsson
- (Iceland national football team) Eiður Guðjohnsen
- (Iceland national football team) Þórður Guðjónsson
- (Iceland national football team) Brynjar Gunnarsson
- (Iceland national football team) Hermann Hreiðarsson
- (Iceland national football team) Rúnar Kristinsson
- (Iceland national football team) Lárus Sigurðsson
- (Russia national football team) Dmitri Alenichev
- (Russia national football team) Aleksandr Mostovoi
- (Russia national football team) Yegor Titov
- (Russia national football team) Ilya Tsymbalar
- (Russia national football team) Yevgeni Varlamov
- (Russia national football team) Igor Yanovsky
- (Ukraine national football team) Yuriy Dmytrulin
- (Ukraine national football team) Vitaliy Kosovskyi
- (Ukraine national football team) Andriy Shevchenko
- (Ukraine national football team) Vladyslav Vashchuk

1 own goal

- (Iceland national football team) Ríkharður Daðason (against France)
- (Russia national football team) Yuri Kovtun (against Iceland)
