= Justo Ruiz =

Andorran-Spanish footballer and manager

Personal information
- Full name: Justo Ruiz González
- Date of birth: 31 August 1969 (age 57)
- Place of birth: Vitoria, Spain
- Height: 1.76 m (5 ft 9 1/2 in)
- Position: Midfielder

Youth career
- Athletic Bilbao

Senior career*
Years	Team	Apps	(Gls)
1987–1992	Bilbao Athletic	84	(0)
1992–1993	Eibar	4	(0)
1993–1994	Gimnàstic	5	(0)
1994	Amurrio		
1994–1997	FC Andorra	79	(4)
1997–1998	Figueres	30	(0)
1998–1999	União Madeira	23	(2)
1999–2004	FC Andorra	69	(5)
2004–2008	Rànger's	64	(36)
Total		358	(47)

International career
1987	Spain U17	2	(1)
1986–1988	Spain U18	11	(1)
1988–1989	Spain U19	3	(0)
1989–1990	Spain U20	4	(0)
1991	Spain U21	1	(0)
1991	Spain U23	2	(0)
1996–2008	Andorra	67	(2)

Managerial career
- 2008–2011: FC Andorra (youth)
- 2008–2019: Andorra U21
- 2011–2016: FC Andorra
- * Club domestic league appearances and goals

Justo Ruiz González (born 31 August 1969) is a former professional footballer who played as a midfielder.

In a 21-year senior career, his professional input consisted of 62 Segunda División games with Bilbao Athletic and Eibar and 23 in the Portuguese Segunda Liga with União da Madeira.

Starting in 2008, Ruiz worked as manager of the Andorra under-21 national team for 11 years.

== Club career ==
Ruiz was born in Vitoria-Gasteiz, Basque Country. After five years in the Spanish Segunda División, four with Athletic Bilbao's reserves and one with SD Eibar, he continued his career in the lower leagues, including three seasons with FC Andorra (who competed in the Spanish system). In 1998–99, he represented C.F. União in Portugal's Segunda Liga.

The following summer, aged 30, Ruiz moved back to FC Andorra, and spent the remainder of his career in the country, competing well into his 30s with FC Rànger's of the microstate's Primera Divisió, with whom he signed in 2004. Starting in 2011 and for five years, he acted as manager of the former club, resigning from his position in September 2016 alongside his entire staff.

== International career ==
Ruiz won 21 caps for Spain across five youth levels. He appeared with the under-20 side at the 1989 FIFA World Youth Championship.

In 1996, Ruiz began representing the Andorra senior team. He played a total of 21 FIFA World Cup qualification games for his adopted country, making his last competitive appearance on 21 November 2007 against Russia at the age of 38 years and two months.

For several years, Ruiz worked as manager of the Andorran under-21s. He left his post in October 2019, after being named Secretary of State for Sports.

=== International goals ===
Scores and results list Andorra's goal tally first.

Goal	Date	Venue	Opponent	Score	Result	Competition
1.	8 September 1999	Camp d’Esports d’Aixovall, Aixovall, Andorra	Russia	1–1	1–2	Euro 2000 qualifying
2.	7 October 2000	Estadi Comunal d'Andorra la Vella, Andorra la Vella, Andorra	Estonia	1–2	1–2	2002 World Cup qualification
