= Daniel Theuma =

Maltese footballer

Personal information
- Full name: Daniel Theuma
- Date of birth: 29 June 1971 (age 55)
- Place of birth: Malta
- Position: Defender

Senior career*
Years	Team	Apps	(Gls)
1991–1992	Gżira United	17	(1)
1992–1993	Floriana	2	(1)
1993–1994	St. George's	18	(4)
1994–1999	Pietà Hotspurs	83	(43)
1999–2004	Valletta	99	(22)
2004–2006	Msida Saint-Joseph	41	(6)
2006	Pietà Hotspurs	5	(2)
2007	Mosta	7	(7)
Total		272	(86)

International career^{‡}
1998–2003	Malta	30	(1)
- * Club domestic league appearances and goals as of 29 June 2024 ‡ National team caps and goals as of 10 August 2008

Daniel Theuma (born 26 June 1971 in Malta) is a Maltese retired footballer.

He came out of retirement in January 2007 to play for Mosta, scoring on his debut against St. Patrick.

== International career ==
Theuma made his debut for Malta in a June 1998 friendly match against Wales and earned a total of 30 caps, scoring 1 goal. His final international was a December 2003 friendly against Poland.

== Honours ==
- Maltese Premier League: 2

1993, 2001

- FA Trophy: 1

2001
