= Agusti Pol =

Andorran footballer

Personal information
- Date of birth: 13 January 1977 (age 49)
- Place of birth: Andorra
- Position: Midfielder

International career
Years	Team	Apps	(Gls)
1996–2003	Andorra	28	(1)

Agusti Pol (born 13 January 1977) is an Andorran football player. He has played for Andorra national team. He scored Andorra first goal ever (and his only international goal) in Andorra's first international match, a 6–1 defeat by Estonia on 13 November 1996.

== National team statistics ==
Andorra national team
Year	Apps	Goals
1996	1	1
1997	2	0
1998	7	0
1999	9	0
2000	0	0
2001	4	0
2002	4	0
2003	1	0
Total	28	1

== International goal ==
Scores and results list Andorra's goal tally first.

No.	Date	Venue	Opponent	Score	Result	Competition
1.	13 November 1996	Estadi Comunal d'Andorra la Vella, Andorra la Vella, Andorra	Estonia	1–1	1–6	friendly match
