= Antoni Sivera =

Andorran footballer

Personal information
- Full name: Antoni Sivera
- Date of birth: 13 April 1978 (age 48)
- Place of birth: Andorra
- Position: Midfielder

Team information
- Current team: FC Campello

Senior career*
Years	Team	Apps	(Gls)
2005–06	US Luzenac		
2006–07	FC Santa Coloma		
2007–	FC Campello		

International career^{‡}
2004–	Andorra	22	(0)
- * Club domestic league appearances and goals as of 21 February 2008 ‡ National team caps and goals as of 21 February 2008

Antoni Sivera (born 13 April 1978) is an Andorran footballer who plays for the Andorra national football team.
