= UEFA Euro 2020 qualifying Group H =

Football tournament qualifying stage

Group H of UEFA Euro 2020 qualifying was one of the ten groups to decide which teams would qualify for the UEFA Euro 2020 finals tournament. Group H consisted of six teams: Albania, Andorra, France, Iceland, Moldova and Turkey, where they played against each other home-and-away in a round-robin format.

The top two teams, France and Turkey, qualified directly for the finals. Unlike previous editions, the participants of the play-offs were not decided based on results from the qualifying group stage, but instead based on their performance in the 2018–19 UEFA Nations League.

== Standings ==
Pos	Team	Pld	W	D	L	GF	GA	GD	Pts	Qualification	(France)	(Turkey)	(Iceland)	(Albania)	(Andorra)	(Moldova)
1	France	10	8	1	1	25	6	+19	25	Qualify for final tournament	—	1–1	4–0	4–1	3–0	2–1
2	Turkey	10	7	2	1	18	3	+15	23	Qualify for final tournament	2–0	—	0–0	1–0	1–0	4–0
3	Iceland	10	6	1	3	14	11	+3	19	Advance to play-offs via Nations League	0–1	2–1	—	1–0	2–0	3–0
4	Albania	10	4	1	5	16	14	+2	13		0–2	0–2	4–2	—	2–2	2–0
5	Andorra	10	1	1	8	3	20	−17	4		0–4	0–2	0–2	0–3	—	1–0
6	Moldova	10	1	0	9	4	26	−22	3		1–4	0–4	1–2	0–4	1–0	—

Source: UEFA
Rules for classification: Qualification tiebreakers

== Matches ==
The fixtures were released by UEFA the same day as the draw, which was held on 2 December 2018 in Dublin. Times are CET/CEST, (Note: CET (UTC+1) for matches in March and November 2019, and CEST (UTC+2) for all other matches.) as listed by UEFA (local times, if different, are in parentheses).

22 March 2019
20:45

Albania	0–2	Turkey
	Report	Yılmaz 21'; Çalhanoğlu 55'

Loro Boriçi Stadium, Shkodër
Attendance: 11,730
Referee: Tobias Stieler (Germany)
22 March 2019
20:45

Andorra	0–2	Iceland
	Report	Bjarnason 22'; Kjartansson 80'

Estadi Nacional, Andorra la Vella
Attendance: 1,854
Referee: Sandro Schärer (Switzerland)
22 March 2019
20:45 (21:45 UTC+2)

Moldova	1–4	France
Ambros 89'	Report	Griezmann 24'; Varane 27'; Giroud 36'; Mbappé 87'

Zimbru Stadium, Chișinău
Attendance: 10,042
Referee: Aleksandar Stavrev (North Macedonia)

25 March 2019
18:00 (20:00 UTC+3)

Turkey	4–0	Moldova
Kaldırım 24'; Tosun 26', 53'; Ayhan 70'	Report

New Eskişehir Stadium, Eskişehir
Attendance: 29,456
Referee: Serhiy Boyko (Ukraine)
25 March 2019
20:45

Andorra	0–3	Albania
	Report	Sadiku 21'; Balaj 87'; Abrashi 90+6'

Estadi Nacional, Andorra la Vella
Attendance: 1,373
Referee: Filip Glova (Slovakia)
25 March 2019
20:45

France	4–0	Iceland
Umtiti 12'; Giroud 68'; Mbappé 78'; Griezmann 84'	Report

Stade de France, Saint-Denis
Attendance: 64,538
Referee: István Kovács (Romania)

8 June 2019
15:00 (13:00 UTC+0)

Iceland	1–0	Albania
J. Guðmundsson 22'	Report

Laugardalsvöllur, Reykjavík
Attendance: 8,968
Referee: Bobby Madden (Scotland)
8 June 2019
18:00 (19:00 UTC+3)

Moldova	1–0	Andorra
Armaș 8'	Report

Zimbru Stadium, Chișinău
Attendance: 6,712
Referee: Bojan Pandžić (Sweden)
8 June 2019
20:45 (21:45 UTC+3)

Turkey	2–0	France
Ayhan 30'; Ünder 40'	Report

Büyükşehir Stadium, Konya
Attendance: 36,783
Referee: Damir Skomina (Slovenia)

11 June 2019
20:45

Albania	2–0	Moldova
Cikalleshi 66'; Ramadani 90+3'	Report

Elbasan Arena, Elbasan
Attendance: 5,004
Referee: Ville Nevalainen (Finland)
11 June 2019
20:45

Andorra	0–4	France
	Report	Mbappé 11'; Ben Yedder 30'; Thauvin 45+1'; Zouma 60'

Estadi Nacional, Andorra la Vella
Attendance: 3,187
Referee: Fran Jović (Croatia)
11 June 2019
20:45 (18:45 UTC+0)

Iceland	2–1	Turkey
R. Sigurðsson 21', 32'	Report	Toköz 40'

Laugardalsvöllur, Reykjavík
Attendance: 9,680
Referee: Szymon Marciniak (Poland)

7 September 2019
18:00 (16:00 UTC+0)

Iceland	3–0	Moldova
Sigþórsson 31'; Bjarnason 55'; Böðvarsson 77'	Report

Laugardalsvöllur, Reykjavík
Attendance: 8,338
Referee: João Pinheiro (Portugal)
7 September 2019
20:45

France	4–1	Albania
Coman 8', 68'; Giroud 27'; Ikoné 85'	Report	Cikalleshi 90' (pen.)

Stade de France, Saint-Denis
Attendance: 77,655
Referee: Jesús Gil Manzano (Spain)
7 September 2019
20:45 (21:45 UTC+3)

Turkey	1–0	Andorra
Tufan 89'	Report

Vodafone Park, Istanbul
Attendance: 42,600
Referee: Donald Robertson (Scotland)

10 September 2019
20:45

Albania	4–2	Iceland
Dermaku 32'; Hysaj 52'; Roshi 79'; Cikalleshi 83'	Report	G. Sigurðsson 47'; Sigþórsson 58'

Elbasan Arena, Elbasan
Attendance: 8,652
Referee: Ivan Kružliak (Slovakia)
10 September 2019
20:45

France	3–0	Andorra
Coman 18'; Lenglet 52'; Ben Yedder 90+1'	Report

Stade de France, Saint-Denis
Attendance: 55,383
Referee: Mykola Balakin (Ukraine)
10 September 2019
20:45 (21:45 UTC+3)

Moldova	0–4	Turkey
	Report	Tosun 37', 79'; Türüç 57'; Yazıcı 88'

Zimbru Stadium, Chișinău
Attendance: 8,281
Referee: Davide Massa (Italy)

11 October 2019
20:45

Andorra	1–0	Moldova
Vales 63'	Report

Estadi Nacional, Andorra la Vella
Attendance: 947
Referee: Jonathan Lardot (Belgium)
11 October 2019
20:45 (18:45 UTC+0)

Iceland	0–1	France
	Report	Giroud 66' (pen.)

Laugardalsvöllur, Reykjavík
Attendance: 9,719
Referee: Gianluca Rocchi (Italy)
11 October 2019
20:45 (21:45 UTC+3)

Turkey	1–0	Albania
Tosun 90'	Report

Şükrü Saracoğlu Stadium, Istanbul
Attendance: 41,438
Referee: Ovidiu Hațegan (Romania)

14 October 2019
20:45

France	1–1	Turkey
Giroud 76'	Report	Ayhan 82'

Stade de France, Saint-Denis
Attendance: 72,154
Referee: Felix Brych (Germany)
14 October 2019
20:45 (18:45 UTC+0)

Iceland	2–0	Andorra
A. Sigurðsson 38'; Sigþórsson 65'	Report

Laugardalsvöllur, Reykjavík
Attendance: 7,169
Referee: Tamás Bognár (Hungary)
14 October 2019
20:45 (21:45 UTC+3)

Moldova	0–4	Albania
	Report	Cikalleshi 22'; Bare 34'; Trashi 40'; Manaj 90'

Zimbru Stadium, Chișinău
Attendance: 4,367
Referee: Chris Kavanagh (England)

14 November 2019
18:00 (20:00 UTC+3)

Turkey	0–0	Iceland
	Report

Türk Telekom Stadium, Istanbul
Attendance: 48,329
Referee: Anthony Taylor (England)
14 November 2019
20:45

Albania	2–2	Andorra
Balaj 6'; Manaj 55'	Report	C. Martínez 18', 48'

Elbasan Arena, Elbasan
Attendance: 4,260
Referee: Kristo Tohver (Estonia)
14 November 2019
20:45

France	2–1	Moldova
Varane 35'; Giroud 79' (pen.)	Report	Rață 9'

Stade de France, Saint-Denis
Attendance: 64,367
Referee: Gediminas Mažeika (Lithuania)

17 November 2019
20:45

Albania	0–2	France
	Report	Tolisso 9'; Griezmann 30'

Arena Kombëtare, Tirana
Attendance: 19,228
Referee: Slavko Vinčić (Slovenia)
17 November 2019
20:45

Andorra	0–2	Turkey
	Report	Ünal 17', 21' (pen.)

Estadi Nacional, Andorra la Vella
Attendance: 2,357
Referee: Ivan Kružliak (Slovakia)
17 November 2019
20:45 (21:45 UTC+2)

Moldova	1–2	Iceland
Milinceanu 56'	Report	Bjarnason 17'; G. Sigurðsson 65'

Zimbru Stadium, Chișinău
Attendance: 6,742
Referee: Pavel Královec (Czech Republic)

== Goalscorers ==
There were 80 goals scored in 30 matches, for an average of 2.67 goals per match.

6 goals

- (France national football team) Olivier Giroud

5 goals

- (Turkey national football team) Cenk Tosun

4 goals

- (Albania national football team) Sokol Cikalleshi

3 goals

- (France national football team) Kingsley Coman
- (France national football team) Antoine Griezmann
- (France national football team) Kylian Mbappé
- (Iceland national football team) Birkir Bjarnason
- (Iceland national football team) Kolbeinn Sigþórsson
- (Turkey national football team) Kaan Ayhan

2 goals

- (Albania national football team) Bekim Balaj
- (Albania national football team) Rey Manaj
- (Andorra national football team) Cristian Martínez
- (France national football team) Wissam Ben Yedder
- (France national football team) Raphaël Varane
- (Iceland national football team) Gylfi Sigurðsson
- (Iceland national football team) Ragnar Sigurðsson
- (Turkey national football team) Enes Ünal

1 goal

- (Albania national football team) Amir Abrashi
- (Albania national football team) Keidi Bare
- (Albania national football team) Kastriot Dermaku
- (Albania national football team) Elseid Hysaj
- (Albania national football team) Ylber Ramadani
- (Albania national football team) Odise Roshi
- (Albania national football team) Armando Sadiku
- (Albania national football team) Lorenc Trashi
- (Andorra national football team) Marc Vales
- (France national football team) Jonathan Ikoné
- (France national football team) Clément Lenglet
- (France national football team) Florian Thauvin
- (France national football team) Corentin Tolisso
- (France national football team) Samuel Umtiti
- (France national football team) Kurt Zouma
- (Iceland national football team) Jón Daði Böðvarsson
- (Iceland national football team) Jóhann Berg Guðmundsson
- (Iceland national football team) Viðar Örn Kjartansson
- (Iceland national football team) Arnór Sigurðsson
- (Moldova national football team) Vladimir Ambros
- (Moldova national football team) Igor Armaș
- (Moldova national football team) Nicolae Milinceanu
- (Moldova national football team) Vadim Rață
- (Turkey national football team) Hakan Çalhanoğlu
- (Turkey national football team) Hasan Ali Kaldırım
- (Turkey national football team) Dorukhan Toköz
- (Turkey national football team) Ozan Tufan
- (Turkey national football team) Deniz Türüç
- (Turkey national football team) Cengiz Ünder
- (Turkey national football team) Yusuf Yazıcı
- (Turkey national football team) Burak Yılmaz

== Discipline ==
A player was automatically suspended for the next match for the following offences:

- Receiving a red card (red card suspensions could be extended for serious offences)
- Receiving three yellow cards in three different matches, as well as after fifth and any subsequent yellow card (yellow card suspensions were not carried forward to the play-offs, the finals or any other future international matches)

The following suspensions were served during the qualifying matches:

Team	Player	Offence(s)	Suspended for match(es)
Albania	Klaus Gjasula	(yellow card) vs France (7 September 2019); (yellow card) vs Turkey (11 October 2019); (yellow card) vs Moldova (14 October 2019)	vs Andorra (14 November 2019)
Andorra	Ildefons Lima	(yellow card) vs Albania (25 March 2019); (yellow card) vs Moldova (8 June 2019); (yellow card) vs Iceland (14 October 2019)	vs Albania (14 November 2019)
Andorra	Cristian Martínez	(yellow card) vs Iceland (22 March 2019); (yellow card) vs Albania (25 March 2019); (yellow card) vs Moldova (11 October 2019)	vs Iceland (14 October 2019)
Andorra	Marc Rebés	(yellow card) vs Iceland (22 March 2019); (yellow card) vs Moldova (8 June 2019); (yellow card) vs Iceland (14 October 2019)	vs Albania (14 November 2019)
Andorra	Chus Rubio	(yellow card) vs Iceland (22 March 2019); (yellow card) vs Albania (25 March 2019); (yellow card) vs France (11 June 2019); (yellow card) vs France (10 September 2019); (yellow card) vs Moldova (11 October 2019); (yellow card) vs Albania (14 November 2019)	vs Turkey (7 September 2019) vs Iceland (14 October 2019) vs Turkey (17 November 2019)
Moldova	Cătălin Carp	(yellow card) vs Andorra (8 June 2019); (yellow card) vs Albania (11 June 2019); (yellow card) vs Iceland (7 September 2019)	vs Turkey (10 September 2019)
Moldova	Radu Gînsari	(yellow card) (yellow-red card) vs Andorra (11 October 2019)	vs Albania (14 October 2019)
Moldova	Artur Ioniță	(yellow card) (yellow-red card) vs Andorra (8 June 2019)	vs Albania (11 June 2019)
