= Steinar Dagur Adolfsson =

Icelandic footballer

Personal information
- Date of birth: 25 January 1970 (age 56)
- Height: 1.80 m (5 ft 11 in)
- Position: Defender

Youth career
- Vikingur

Senior career*
Years	Team	Apps	(Gls)
1988–1994	Valur	102	(13)
1995	KR Reykjavik	8	(0)
1996–1998	IA Akranes	51	(1)
1999–2001	Kongsvinger	34	(2)
2004	UMF Skallagrimur	1	(0)
2006	UMF Skallagrimur	1	(0)

International career
	Iceland U16	7	(0)
	Iceland U17	2	(0)
	Iceland U18	13	(3)
	Iceland U21	17	(0)
1991–1999	Iceland	14	(1)
- * Club domestic league appearances and goals

Steinar Dagur Adolfsson (born 25 January 1970) is a retired Icelandic football defender.

In his early career he played for Valur, KR Reykjavik and ÍA Akranes. Ahead of the 1999 season, amid interest from IF Elfsborg and Tromsø IL, he joined Kongsvinger IL, and played semi-regularly the first two seasons. He left after the 2001 season.

He was extensively capped for Iceland on youth level, especially U18 and U21, and was subsequently capped 14 times and scored 1 goal for Iceland.
