= Cristian Martínez (Andorran footballer) =

Andorran footballer

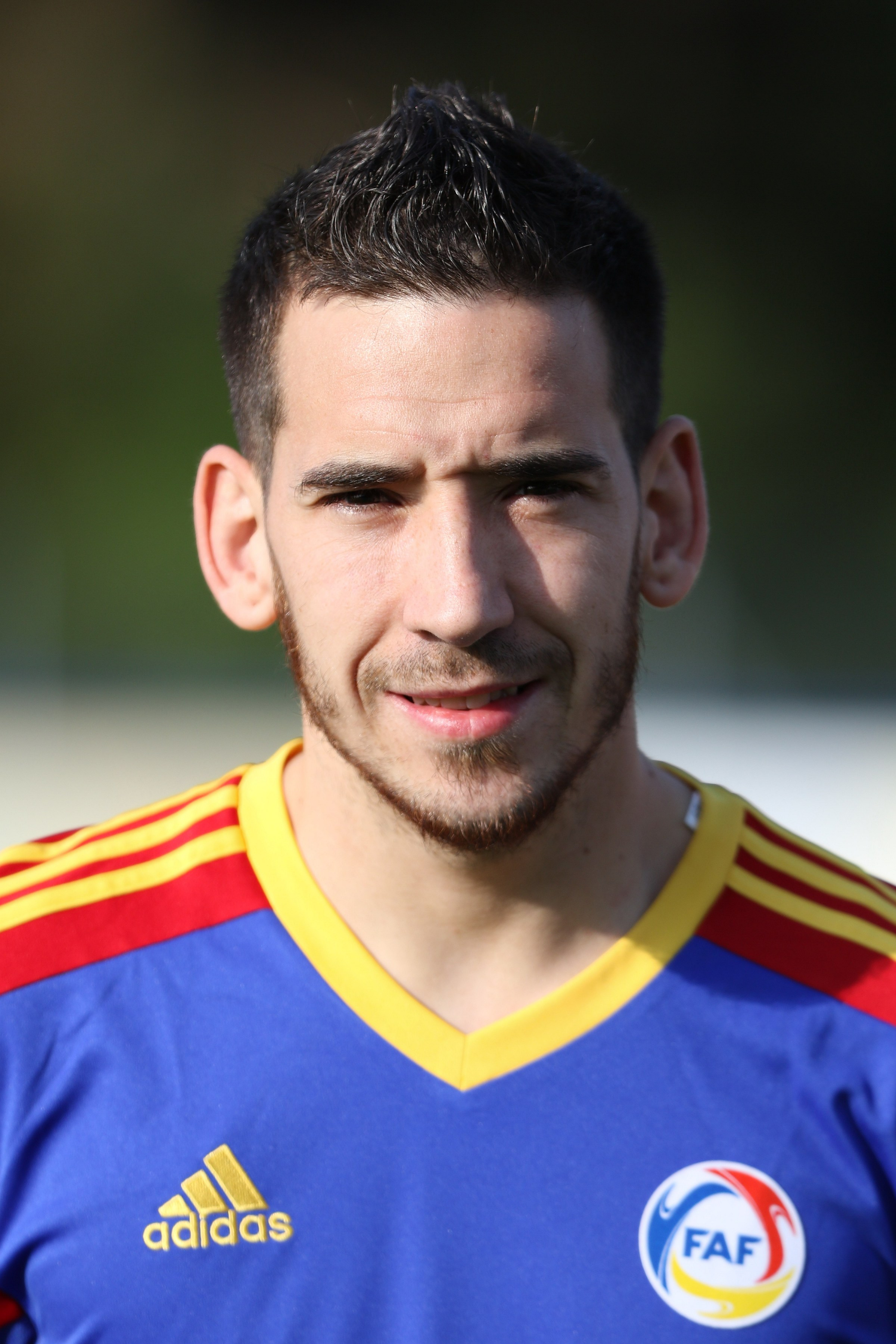

Personal information
- Full name: Cristian Martínez Alejo
- Date of birth: 16 October 1989 (age 37)
- Place of birth: Andorra la Vella, Andorra
- Height: 1.70 m (5 ft 7 in)
- Position: Right winger

Senior career*
Years	Team	Apps	(Gls)
2007–2013	FC Andorra	140	(77)
2013–2014	Lusitanos	18	(9)
2014–2016	FC Santa Coloma	35	(30)
2016–2019	FC Andorra	91	(34)
2019–2021	Inter d'Escaldes	38	(5)
2021–2022	FC Santa Coloma	15	(0)
2022	UE Engordany	3	(0)
2023	Ordino	9	(0)
2023–2024	Atlètic Amèrica	0	(0)
Total		334	(154)

International career
2005	Andorra U17	3	(0)
2006–2007	Andorra U19	4	(0)
2009–2010	Andorra U21	6	(0)
2009–2021	Andorra	77	(5)
- * Club domestic league appearances and goals

Cristian Martínez Alejo (born 16 October 1989) is an Andorran former footballer who played as a right winger for the Andorra national team.

== Club career ==
Born in Andorra la Vella, Martínez has played club football for FC Andorra, Lusitanos, and Santa Coloma.

== International career ==
Martínez has represented Andorra at youth level, playing for the under-17, under-19, and under-21 national teams. He made his senior debut in 2009.

=== International goals ===
Scores and results list Andorra's goal tally first.

Goal	Date	Venue	Opponent	Score	Result	Competition
1.	7 September 2010	Aviva Stadium, Dublin, Ireland	Republic of Ireland	1–2	1–3	UEFA Euro 2012 qualification
2.	22 February 2017	Stadio Olimpico di Serravalle, Serravalle, San Marino	San Marino	2–0	2–0	Friendly
3.	15 November 2018	Estadi Nacional, Andorra la Vella, Andorra	Georgia	1–1	1–1	2018–19 UEFA Nations League D
4.	14 November 2019	Elbasan Arena, Elbasan, Albania	Albania	1–1	2–2	UEFA Euro 2020 qualification
5.	14 November 2019	Elbasan Arena, Elbasan, Albania	Albania	2–1	2–2	UEFA Euro 2020 qualification
