= Antoni Lima =

Andorran footballer

Toni Lima
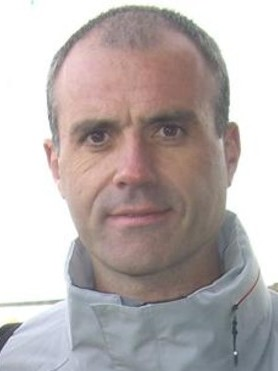
- Lima in 2007

Personal information
- Full name: Antoni Lima Solà
- Date of birth: 22 September 1970 (age 56)
- Place of birth: Gavà, Spain
- Height: 1.91 m (6 ft 3 in)
- Position: Centre-back

Team information
- Current team: Arsenal (scout)

Youth career
- 1986–1989: Barcelona
- 1989–1990: Damm

Senior career*
Years	Team	Apps	(Gls)
1988–1989	Barcelona C	3	(0)
1990–1991	Real Madrid B	8	(0)
1991–1992	Hospitalet	34	(7)
1991	Español	2	(0)
1992–1995	Palamós	100	(9)
1995–1996	Poli Almería	30	(1)
1996–1997	Murcia	21	(1)
1997–1998	Poli Almería	34	(0)
1998–1999	União Madeira	7	(0)
1999–2000	Hospitalet	30	(1)
2000–2001	Gavà	24	(0)
2001	Ionikos	3	(0)
2002–2003	Gavà	54	(6)
2003–2004	Palamós B	31	(0)
2004–2006	Palamós	56	(4)
2006	Amurrio		
2006–2008	Ibiza-Eivissa B		
2007–2008	Ibiza-Eivissa		

International career
1997–2009	Andorra	64	(1)
- * Club domestic league appearances and goals

Antoni "Toni" Lima Solà (born 22 September 1970) is a former professional footballer who played as a central defender.

== Early life ==
Born in Gavà, Barcelona, Catalonia to an Andalusian father and a Catalan mother, Lima's family moved to Andorra when he was nine years old.

== Club career ==
Lima had a brief spell with Real Madrid Castilla, then signed with RCD Español, for which he played two La Liga games. In 1992, he stayed in his native region and spent three seasons with Palamós CF in the Segunda División, being relegated in the last.

After another season in the second division, with CP Almería, Lima spent the remainder of his Spanish career in the Segunda División B or lower. He also had two abroad experiences: in 1998 he joined C.F. União, appearing rarely as the Portuguese second-tier team was also relegated. Three years later, also with no impact whatsoever, he represented Ionikos F.C. in the Super League Greece.

Lima retired at SE Eivissa-Ibiza in 2008 at the age of 37, having acted as the club's director of football still as an active player. He later worked with Premier League sides Manchester United and Arsenal as well as Inter Milan of Serie A as scout, and Deportivo Alavés as director of international football.

== International career ==
Lima won 64 caps for Andorra over a 12-year period. On 10 June 2009, in his last international, a 6–0 loss to England for the 2010 FIFA World Cup qualifiers at Wembley Stadium, he wore the captain's armband.

In September 2005, Lima was subject of some controversy during a World Cup qualification match against the Netherlands. When Ruud van Nistelrooy missed a penalty, the defender celebrated directly in front of the Dutch player. Moments later, the striker scored from open play and ran straight over to Lima with his arms raised, being booked for his action in an eventual 4–0 win.

=== International goal ===
Scores and results list Andorra's goal tally first, score column indicates score after each Lima goal.

List of international goals scored by Antoni Lima
No.	Date	Venue	Opponent	Score	Result	Competition
1	16 October 2002	Vasil Levski National Stadium, Sofia, Bulgaria	Bulgaria	1–2	1–2	Euro 2004 qualifying

== Personal life ==
Lima's younger brother, Ildefons, is also a footballer and a defender. He too spent most of his career in the lower leagues of Spain, and the pair shared teams at Ionikos.
