= Juli Sánchez =

Andorran footballer

Personal information
- Full name: Julià Sánchez Soto
- Date of birth: 20 June 1978 (age 48)
- Place of birth: Andorra la Vella, Andorra
- Height: 1.68 m (5 ft 6 in)
- Position: Forward

Team information
- Current team: IC d'Escaldes
- Number: 22

Senior career*
Years	Team	Apps	(Gls)
1995–1998	FC Andorra	29	(0)
1998–1999	Camacha	5	(0)
1999–2002	FC Andorra		
2002–2005	Balaguer		
2005–2006	Binéfar		
2006–2008	FC Andorra	31	(12)
2008–2012	FC Santa Coloma		
2012–2013	Lusitanos	7	(1)
2013–2016	FC Andorra	63	(9)
2016–2017	UE Santa Coloma	11	(3)
2017–2019	FC Santa Coloma	29	(8)
2019–	IC d'Escaldes	5	(0)

International career^{‡}
1996–2019	Andorra	73	(1)
- * Club domestic league appearances and goals as of 15:10, 24 February 2020 (UTC) ‡ National team caps and goals as of 11 June 2019

Juli Sánchez (born 20 June 1978) is an Andorran international footballer. He currently plays as a forward for Inter Club d'Escaldes.

Sánchez formerly played for FC Andorra, CF Balaguer and CD Binéfar; he made his international debut in 1996, in Andorra's first ever FIFA recognised international, against Estonia. He also scored in their first ever win, against Belarus on 26 April 2000. His last international cap was a UEFA Euro 2020 qualifying game against France on 11 June 2019. At 40 years and 11 months, he became Andorra's oldest player ever. His record was eventually broken by Ildefons Lima in June 2021 and Marc Pujol in November 2024.

== International statistics ==
As of 1 January 2019

Andorra national team
Year	Apps	Goals
1996	1	0
1997	2	0
1998	8	0
1999	7	0
2000	8	1
2001	5	0
2002	5	0
2003	6	0
2004	7	0
2005	5	0
2006	2	0
2007	3	0
2009	1	0
2011	4	0
2014	1	0
2015	1	0
2016	1	0
2017	2	0
2018	2	0
2019	2	0
Total	73	1

=== International goals ===
Scores and results list Andorra's goal tally first.

No.	Date	Venue	Opponent	Score	Result	Competition	Ref.
1.	26 April 2000	Camp d'Esports d'Aixovall, Aixovall, Andorra	Belarus	2–0	2–0	Friendly	
