= Garnik Avalyan =

Armenian and Russian footballer

Personal information
- Full name: Garnik Avalyan
- Date of birth: 6 September 1962 (age 64)
- Place of birth: Ijevan, Armenian SSR, Soviet Union
- Height: 1.76 m (5 ft 9 in)
- Position: Striker

Senior career*
Years	Team	Apps	(Gls)
1984	Iskra Smolensk (reserves)	9	(1)
1988–1992	Torpedo Ryazan	163	(49)
1993–1998	Krylia Sovetov Samara	192	(28)
1999	Shinnik Yaroslavl	10	(0)
1999–2000	Uralan Elista	31	(6)
2000	Volgar-Gazprom Astrakhan	17	(0)
2004	Ryazan-Agrokomplekt-2 Ryazan		

International career
1997–1998	Armenia	6	(2)

Managerial career
- 2002–2006: FC Ryazan-Agrokomplekt Ryazan
- 2008–2010: FC Ryazan
- 2013–2019: FC Ryazan
- * Club domestic league appearances and goals

Garnik Avalyan (Armenian: Գառնիկ Ավալյան; born 6 September 1962) is an Armenian and Russian football coach and a retired striker. He was a member of the Armenia national team, and has participated in 6 international matches and scored 2 goals since his debut in an away 1998 FIFA World Cup qualification match against Portugal on 20 August 1997.

== International goals ==
#	Date	Venue	Opponent	Score	Result	Competition
1	6 September 1997	Armenia	Albania	3-0	Win	1998 WCQ
2	5 September 1998	Armenia	Andorra	3-1	Win	2000 ECQ
