= Jesús Lucendo =

Andorran footballer

Personal information
- Full name: Jesús Julián Lucendo Heredia
- Date of birth: 19 April 1970 (age 56)
- Place of birth: Pedro Muñoz, Spain
- Height: 1.73 m (5 ft 8 in)
- Position: Midfielder

Team information
- Current team: Andorra U19 (coach)

Youth career
- Barcelona

Senior career*
Years	Team	Apps	(Gls)
1988–1991	Barcelona C	6	(0)
1989	Barcelona	1	(0)
1990–1991	→ Linense (loan)	26	(3)
1991–1993	FC Andorra	49	(16)
1993	Cartagena	7	(2)
1993–1996	FC Andorra	79	(10)
1996–1997	Tremp		
1997–2002	FC Andorra	153	(19)
2002–2003	FC Santa Coloma		
2003	FC Andorra	7	(1)

International career^{‡}
1996–2003	Andorra	29	(3)

Managerial career
- 2006–2010: Rànger's
- 2012–2013: Andorra U17
- 2014–2016: Andorra U19
- 2016–2017: Andorra U21
- 2017–: Andorra U19
- * Club domestic league appearances and goals as of 7 June 2010 ‡ National team caps and goals as of 5 March 2008

Jesús Julián Lucendo (born 19 April 1970) is a former Andorran national footballer of Spanish origin. He made 27 appearances internationally for Andorra. He had an extensive club career as well, including one season with FC Barcelona. He retired in November 2003 due to a knee injury.

== International statistics ==
Updated 28 September 2014.

Andorra national team
Year	Apps	Goals
1996	1	0
1997	2	0
1998	7	2
1999	5	0
2000	4	1
2001	4	0
2002	1	0
2003	5	0
Total	29	3

=== International goals ===
Scores and results list Andorra's goal tally first.

Goal	Date	Venue	Opponent	Score	Result	Competition
1.	22 June 1998	Kuressaare linnastaadion, Kuressaare, Estonia	Estonia	1–1	1–2	Friendly
2.	5 September 1998	Hrazdan Stadium, Yerevan, Armenia	Armenia	1–2	1–3	Euro 2000 qualifier
3.	26 April 2000	Camp d’Esports d’Aixovall, Aixovall, Andorra	Belarus	1–0	2–0	Friendly
