= Ildefons Lima =

Andorran footballer (born 1979)

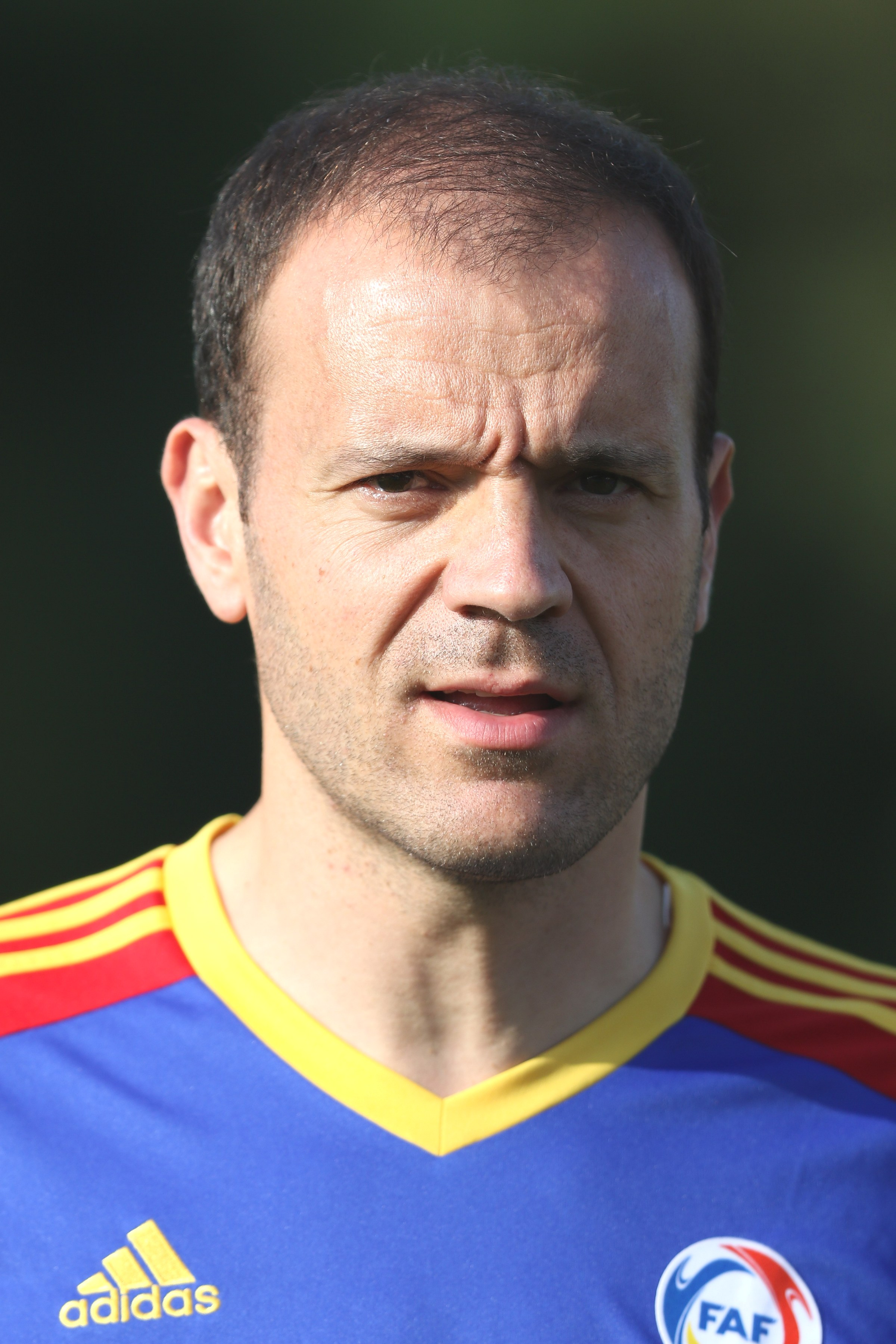
- Lima with Andorra in 2016

Personal information
- Full name: Ildefons Lima Solà
- Date of birth: 10 December 1979 (age 46)
- Place of birth: Barcelona, Spain
- Height: 1.92 m (6 ft 4 in)
- Position: Centre-back

Youth career
- Damm
- FC Andorra

Senior career*
Years	Team	Apps	(Gls)
1996–1999	FC Andorra	58	(2)
1999–2000	Espanyol B	1	(0)
2000–2001	Sant Andreu	25	(2)
2001–2002	Ionikos	0	(0)
2002	Pachuca	3	(1)
2002–2003	Las Palmas	25	(2)
2004	Poli Ejido	2	(0)
2004–2005	Rayo Vallecano	34	(1)
2005–2009	Triestina	80	(1)
2009–2011	Bellinzona	43	(4)
2011–2012	Triestina	17	(2)
2012–2014	FC Andorra	45	(15)
2014–2018	Santa Coloma	64	(10)
2018–2022	Inter d'Escaldes	53	(5)
2022–2023	FC Andorra B	13	(0)
Total		463	(45)

International career
1997–2023	Andorra	137	(11)
- * Club domestic league appearances and goals

Ildefons Lima Solà (born 10 December 1979) is an Andorran former professional footballer who played as a centre-back.

He played club football in Spain, Greece, Mexico, Italy, Switzerland and Andorra. In a 26-year international career, the longest in men's football history, Lima set the records for most appearances and most goals for Andorra (137 and 11).

== Early life ==
Lima was born in Barcelona, Catalonia to an Andalusian father and a Catalan mother. His family moved to Andorra when he was two months old.

== Club career ==
Lima's first years as a senior were spent with FC Andorra, playing one season each in the Spanish third and fourth divisions. Subsequently, he played at both levels with RCD Espanyol B and UE Sant Andreu, splitting the following campaign abroad between Ionikos F.C. of Greece and C.F. Pachuca in Mexico.

In the summer of 2002, Lima returned to Spain, remaining one and a half seasons at newly relegated UD Las Palmas in the Segunda División. He scored his only two goals as a professional in the country on 22 December 2002 and 14 June 2003, respectively against Levante UD (1–1) and CD Numancia (1–0 away win); he appeared just three times in 2003–04, ended with relegation. He moved in January 2004 to another team in that league, Polideportivo Ejido, and spent the following campaign with Rayo Vallecano in division three.

Lima then played four years with US Triestina Calcio 1918 in Italy. With the Trieste side, he was occasionally used as a forward at the request of elusive chairman Flaviano Tonellotto. In 2009, aged nearly 30, he switched countries again, signing for AC Bellinzona of the Swiss Super League.

After two seasons in Switzerland and one back at Triestina, Lima signed again for FC Andorra, now of the Primera Catalana, instead of several offers to play in the principality's Primera Divisió. On 12 June 2014, he joined the latter league's champion FC Santa Coloma. He scored for them on 8 July in the first qualifying round of the UEFA Champions League away to FC Banants, as they advanced on away goals; he also claimed four national championships in a row.

Having spent four years with Santa Coloma, Lima signed with Inter Club d'Escaldes in August 2018, winning their first league in history in 2019–20 and repeating the feat the next two campaigns. Following another spell of the same length, he returned to FC Andorra to play for the reserve team, with the club now owned by Gerard Piqué.

== International career ==
Lima made his debut for Andorra aged 17 years and 6 months, in the country's second ever game on 22 June 1997, scoring in a 4–1 friendly defeat in Estonia, becoming their youngest player and goalscorer. In the process, he earned more than 130 caps.

In June 2009, near the end of the 2010 FIFA World Cup qualifying campaign, Lima scored his first competitive goal for over eight years and six years overall, netting the last goal of a 5–1 away loss against Belarus. On 9 September 2014, in Andorra's first match of the UEFA Euro 2016 qualification phase, he netted a sixth-minute penalty to give the side a 1–0 lead over Wales, but in an eventual 1–2 home defeat.

After Óscar Sonejee, Lima was the second Andorran to reach a century of caps, playing his 100th game on 1 June 2016, a 2–0 friendly loss to Estonia in Tallinn. On 22 February 2017 he opened a 2–0 away win over San Marino in another exhibition game, ending an 86-game winless run.

Lima surpassed Sonejee's national record of 106 internationals on 16 August 2017, when he played a friendly against Qatar in Burton-on-Trent. In 2020, the Andorran Football Federation removed him from the team – against the wishes of coach Koldo Álvarez – when the player spoke out against football resuming in the principality without COVID-19 testing. FIFPRO, the world's trade union for footballers, called for FIFA to intervene in his favour.

On 3 June 2021, Lima became just the third European footballer (after Billy Meredith and Jari Litmanen) to be capped in four different decades when playing in a friendly defeat to Republic of Ireland. On 10 June 2022, after featuring five minutes of the 2–1 victory over Liechtenstein in a UEFA Nations League fixture, he became at 41 years and 6 months Andorra's oldest player ever, breaking Juli Sánchez's record.

On 16 June 2023, the 43-year-old Lima became the oldest player to appear at a UEFA European Championship qualifying match. He retired from the national team after a Euro 2024 qualifier against Switzerland on 12 September 2023; he was substituted after 23 minutes to a standing ovation by both sets of supporters and replaced by Ricard Fernández, a player born two years into his international career. His 26-year spell for his country was the longest in men's football history.

Lima's record of youngest-ever capped player was broken by Marc Pujol in 2000, by one month.

== Personal life ==
Despite debuting for the Andorra national team when he was 17, Lima became a citizen of the country when he lived there for 20 years. His older brother, Antoni, was also a footballer and a defender. He too spent most of his career in the lower leagues of Spain, and the pair shared teams at Ionikos.

== Career statistics ==
=== Club ===
Appearances and goals by club, season and competition
Club	Season	League			National cup		Continental		Other		Total	
Club	Season	Division	Apps	Goals	Apps	Goals	Apps	Goals	Apps	Goals	Apps	Goals
FC Andorra	1996–97	Segunda División B	0	0	0	0	0	0	—		0	0
FC Andorra	1997–98	Segunda División B	32	0	0	0	0	0	—		32	0
FC Andorra	1998–99	Tercera División	26	2	0	0	0	0	—		26	2
FC Andorra	Total		58	2	0	0	0	0	0	0	58	2
Espanyol B	1999–2000	Tercera División	1	0	0	0	0	0	—		1	0
Sant Andreu	2000–01	Tercera División	25	2	0	0	0	0	—		25	2
Ionikos	2001–02	Super League Greece	0	0	0	0	0	0	—		0	0
Pachuca	2002	Liga MX	3	1	0	0	0	0	—		3	1
Las Palmas	2002–03	Segunda División	22	2	1	0	0	0	—		23	2
Las Palmas	2003–04	Segunda División	3	0	0	0	0	0	—		3	0
Las Palmas	Total		25	2	1	0	0	0	0	0	26	2
Poli Ejido	2003–04	Segunda División	2	0	0	0	0	0	—		2	0
Rayo Vallecano	2004–05	Segunda División B	34	1	0	0	0	0	—		34	1
Triestina	2005–06	Serie B	21	0	0	0	0	0	—		21	0
Triestina	2006–07	Serie B	34	1	2	0	0	0	—		36	1
Triestina	2007–08	Serie B	21	0	3	0	0	0	—		24	0
Triestina	2008–09	Serie B	4	0	2	0	0	0	—		6	0
Triestina	Total		80	1	7	0	0	0	0	0	87	1
Bellinzona	2009–10	Swiss Super League	24	4	0	0	0	0	—		24	4
Bellinzona	2010–11	Swiss Super League	19	0	1	0	0	0	—		20	0
Bellinzona	Total		43	4	1	0	0	0	0	0	44	4
Triestina	2011–12	Lega Pro Prima Divisione	17	2	0	0	0	0	—		17	2
FC Andorra	2012–13	Primera Catalana	17	5	0	0	0	0	—		17	5
FC Andorra	2013–14	Primera Catalana	28	10	0	0	0	0	—		28	10
FC Andorra	Total		45	15	0	0	0	0	0	0	45	15
Santa Coloma	2014–15	Primera Divisió	12	3	4	4	2	1	1	0	19	8
Santa Coloma	2015–16	Primera Divisió	17	4	2	1	2	1	—		21	6
Santa Coloma	2016–17	Primera Divisió	18	0	2	0	2	0	0	0	22	0
Santa Coloma	2017–18	Primera Divisió	17	3	1	1	2	1	1	0	20	5
Santa Coloma	2018–19	Primera Divisió	0	0	0	0	3	0	0	0	3	0
Santa Coloma	Total		64	10	9	6	9	3	2	0	84	19
Inter d'Escaldes	2018–19	Primera Divisió	15	0	1	0	–	–	—		16	0
Inter d'Escaldes	2019–20	Primera Divisió	20	2	1	0	–	–	—		21	2
Inter d'Escaldes	2020–21	Primera Divisió	10	1	1	0	1	0	1	1	13	2
Inter d'Escaldes	2021–22	Primera Divisió	8	2	0	0	3	0	1	0	12	2
Inter d'Escaldes	2022–23	Primera Divisió	0	0	0	0	3	0	0	0	3	0
Inter d'Escaldes	Total		53	5	3	0	7	0	2	1	65	6
FC Andorra B	2022–23	Tercera Catalana	13	0	–	–	–	–	—		13	0
Career total			463	45	21	6	16	3	4	1	504	55

=== International ===
Appearances and goals by national team and year
National team	Year	Apps	Goals
Andorra	1997	2	1
Andorra	1998	7	0
Andorra	1999	8	0
Andorra	2000	8	1
Andorra	2001	3	1
Andorra	2002	4	1
Andorra	2003	2	0
Andorra	2004	5	0
Andorra	2005	5	0
Andorra	2006	0	0
Andorra	2007	6	0
Andorra	2008	6	1
Andorra	2009	5	2
Andorra	2010	4	0
Andorra	2011	6	0
Andorra	2012	7	0
Andorra	2013	6	0
Andorra	2014	6	2
Andorra	2015	7	1
Andorra	2016	6	0
Andorra	2017	8	1
Andorra	2018	8	0
Andorra	2019	9	0
Andorra	2020	0	0
Andorra	2021	5	0
Andorra	2022	1	0
Andorra	2023	3	0
Total		137	11

Scores and results list Andorra's goal tally first, score column indicates score after each Lima goal.

List of international goals scored by Ildefons Lima
No.	Date	Venue	Opponent	Score	Result	Competition
1	22 June 1997	Linnastaadion, Kuressaare, Estonia	Estonia	1–3	1–4	Friendly
2	2 September 2000	Communal d'Aixovall, Andorra La Vella, Andorra	Cyprus	2–1	2–3	2002 FIFA World Cup qualification
3	25 April 2001	Lansdowne Road, Dublin, Republic of Ireland	Republic of Ireland	1–0	1–3	2002 FIFA World Cup qualification
4	27 March 2002	Ta' Qali Stadium, Ta' Qali, Malta	Malta	1–0	1–1	Friendly
5	4 June 2008	Comunal d'Aixovall, Andorra la Vella, Andorra	Azerbaijan	1–1	1–2	Friendly
6	11 February 2009	S. Darius and S. Girėnas, Kaunas, Lithuania	Lithuania	1–2	1–3	Friendly
7	6 June 2009	Neman Stadium, Grodno, Belarus	Belarus	1–5	1–5	2010 FIFA World Cup qualification
8	9 September 2014	Estadi Nacional, Andorra la Vella, Andorra	Wales	1–0	1–2	UEFA Euro 2016 qualifying
9	13 October 2014	Estadi Nacional, Andorra la Vella, Andorra	Israel	1–1	1–4	UEFA Euro 2016 qualifying
10	11 October 2015	Estadi Nacional, Andorra la Vella, Andorra	Belgium	1–2	1–4	UEFA Euro 2016 qualifying
11	22 February 2017	Olimpico di Serravalle, Serravalle, San Marino	San Marino	1–0	2–0	Friendly

== Honours ==
Santa Coloma

- Primera Divisió: 2014–15, 2015–16, 2016–17, 2017–18
- Copa Constitució: 2018

Inter d'Escaldes

- Primera Divisió: 2019–20, 2020–21, 2021–22
- Copa Constitució: 2020
- Andorran Supercup: 2020, 2021

== See also ==
- List of men's footballers with 100 or more international caps
