= Estadi Comunal d'Andorra la Vella =

Football stadium in Andorra

Coordinates: 42°30′5″N 1°30′50″E

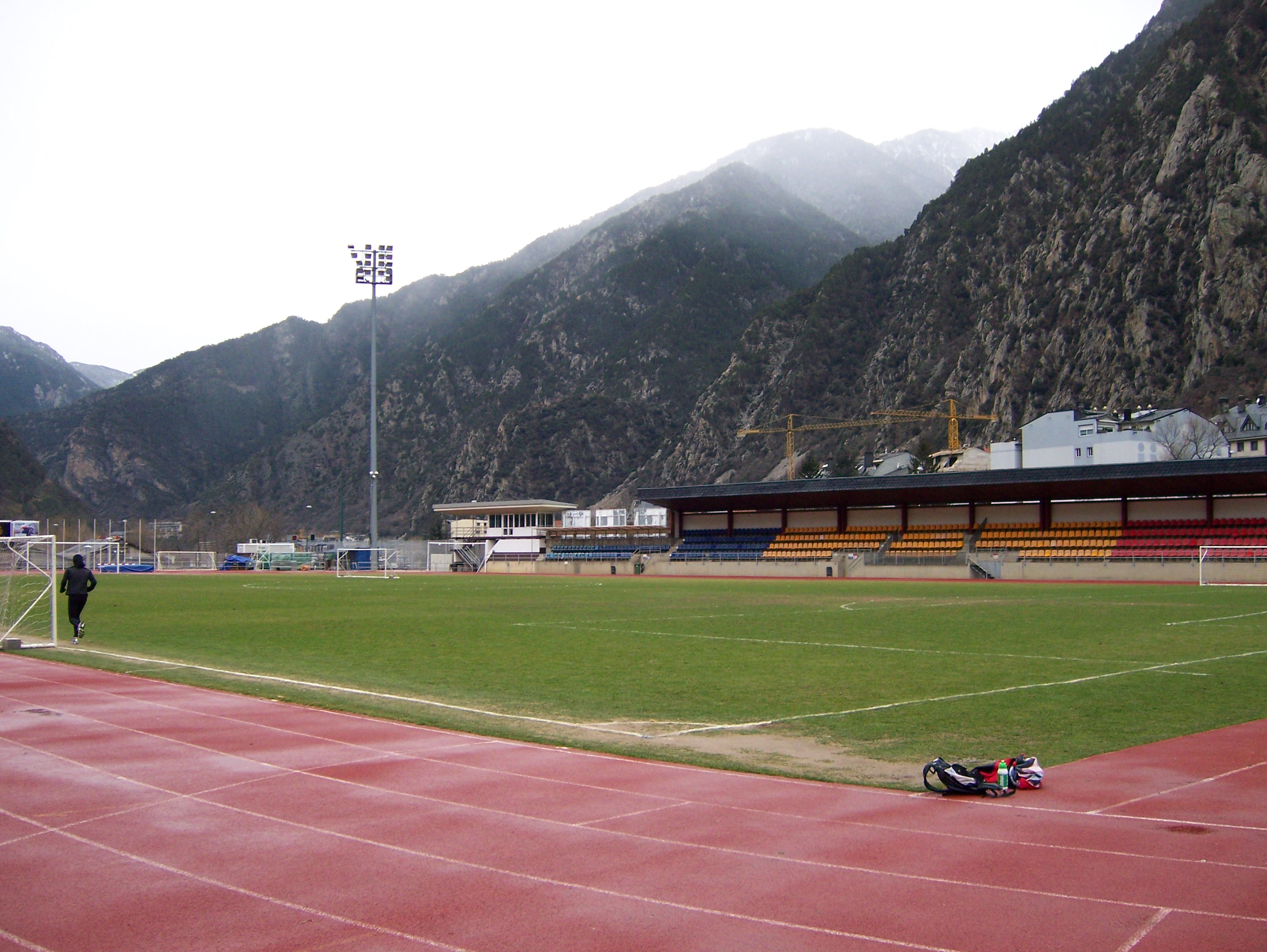
- Interactive map of Estadi Comunal d'Andorra la Vella
- Full name: Estadi Comunal d'Andorra la Vella
- Location: Andorra la Vella, Andorra
- Capacity: 1,249
- Surface: Grass

The Estadi Comunal d'Andorra la Vella is a small football stadium in Andorra la Vella, the capital of Andorra. The stadium has a capacity of 1,249. It was built in 1990. The stadium also has a running track. The Estadi Comunal d'Andorra la Vella and the Camp d'Esports d'Aixovall together host all games from Andorra's two highest football competitions, the Primera Divisió and the Segona Divisió. It also hosted all Andorra national football team games until the opening of the Estadi Nacional in 2014.

== History ==
Due its size, Andorra occasionally had to move matches away from the Estadi Comunal d'Andorra la Vella. An example of this occurred during UEFA Euro 2008 qualifying when the Andorran Football Federation opted to move their match against the England national football team to the Estadi Olímpic Lluís Companys in Barcelona, Spain in order to accommodate the large number of England fans. The ground does meet the UEFA stadium criteria to host UEFA Europa League qualifying matches. However it has since been adjudged to no longer meet UEFA standards for hosting international competitive games.

Owing to its location under the Pyrenees, it is noted to have a swirling wind that can affect play. In 2015, the football magazine FourFourTwo named it as one of their top twelve most beautiful football grounds in the world.

In 2024, it was proposed that the Estadi Comunal d'Andorra la Vella would be renovated and expanded in order for FC Andorra to continue to meet Royal Spanish Football Federation rules about having to play league matches on natural grass pitches after the Estadi Nacional was converted to artificial pitch for the Andorra national rugby union team. However, this proposal was dropped after opposition from FC Andorra owner Gerard Piqué. In 2025, the stadium caught fire during renovations in preparation for the Games of the Small States of Europe, after receiving a €514,000 grant for them. However the Andorran Fire Brigade were able to extinguish it and only a scissor lift was damaged.
