= Portugal national football team results (2000–2019) =

This page is a list of all the matches that Portugal national football team has played between 2000 and 2019.

== 2000s ==
=== 2000 ===
23 February 2000 Friendly	Belgium	1–1	Portugal	Stade du Pays de Charleroi, Charleroi, Belgium
	Strupar 56'		Sá Pinto 81'	Attendance: 24,000; Referee: Knud Erik Fisker (Denmark)

29 March 2000 Friendly	Portugal	2–1	Denmark	Estádio Dr. Magalhães Pessoa, Leiria, Portugal
	Rui Costa 41' (pen.); Figo 51'		Tomasson 4'	Attendance: 11,000; Referee: John McDermott (Northern Ireland)

26 April 2000 Friendly	Italy	2–0	Portugal	Stadio Oreste Granillo, Reggio Calabria, Italy
	Iuliano 74'; Totti 87'			Attendance: 23,199; Referee: Emmanuel Zammit (Malta)

2 June 2000 Friendly	Portugal	3–0	Wales	Estádio Municipal, Chaves, Portugal
	Figo 21'; Sá Pinto 44'; Capucho 66'			Attendance: 11,000; Referee: Frank De Bleeckere (Belgium)

12 June 2000 2000 EURO GS	Portugal	3–2	England	Philips Stadion, Eindhoven, Netherlands
18:45 WET	Figo 22'; Pinto 37'; Nuno Gomes 59'		Scholes 3'; McManaman 18'	Attendance: 30,000; Referee: Anders Frisk (Sweden)

17 June 2000 2000 EURO GS	Romania	0–1	Portugal	GelreDome, Arnhem, Netherlands
18:45 WET			Costinha 90+4'	Attendance: 18,000; Referee: Gilles Veissière (France)

20 June 2000 2000 EURO GS	Portugal	3–0	Germany	De Kuip, Rotterdam, Netherlands
18:45 WET	Conceição 35', 54', 71'			Attendance: 44,000; Referee: Dick Jol (Netherlands)

24 June 2000 2000 EURO 1/4	Turkey	0–2	Portugal	Amsterdam Arena, Amsterdam, Netherlands
16:00 WET			Nuno Gomes 44', 56'	Attendance: 42,000; Referee: Dick Jol (Netherlands)

28 June 2000 2000 EURO 1/2	Portugal	1–2 (a.e.t.)	France	King Baudouin Stadium, Brussels, Belgium
18:45 WET	Nuno Gomes 19'		Henry 51'; Zidane 117' (pen.)	Attendance: 50,000; Referee: Günter Benkö (Austria)

16 August 2000 Friendly	Portugal	5–1	Lithuania	Estádio do Fontelo, Viseu, Portugal
	Pinto 31'; Figo 38'; Rui Costa 47' (pen.); Beto 80'; Pauleta 86'		Artūras Fomenka 44'	Attendance: 11,000; Referee: Graziano Cesare (Italy)

3 September 2000 2002 W.C. Q	Estonia	1–3	Portugal	Kadrioru Stadium, Tallinn, Estonia
	Oper 84'		Rui Costa 14'; Figo 49'; Sá Pinto 57'	Attendance: 4,700; Referee: Charles Agius (Malta)

7 October 2000 2002 W.C. Q	Portugal	1–1	Republic of Ireland	Estádio da Luz, Lisbon, Portugal
	Conceição 57'		Holland 73'	Attendance: 43,500; Referee: Atanas Ouzounov (Bulgaria)

11 October 2000 2002 W.C. Q	Netherlands	0–2	Portugal	De Kuip, Rotterdam, Netherlands
			Conceição 11'; Pauleta 44'	Attendance: 44,620; Referee: Graham Poll (England)

15 November 2000 Friendly	Portugal	2–1	Israel	Estádio Primeiro de Maio, Braga, Portugal
	Figo 49'; J. Costa 61'		Benayoun 85'	Attendance: 20,000; Referee: Georgios Kasnaferis (Greece)

=== 2001 ===
28 February 2001 2002 W.C. Q	Portugal	3–0	Andorra	Estádio dos Barreiros, Funchal, Portugal
	Figo 1', 49'; Pauleta 36'			Attendance: 9,000; Referee: Paul Allaerts (Belgium)

28 March 2001 2002 W.C. Q	Portugal	2–2	Netherlands	Estádio das Antas, Porto, Portugal
	Pauleta 83'; Figo 90+3' (pen.)		Hasselbaink 18' (pen.); Kluivert 48'	Attendance: 42,164; Referee: Urs Meier (Switzerland)

25 April 2001 Friendly	France	4–0	Portugal	Stade de France, Saint-Denis, France
	Wiltord 16'; Silvestre 32'; Henry 33'; Djorkaeff 79'			Attendance: 78,832; Referee: Hellmut Krug (Germany)

2 June 2001 2002 W.C. Q	Republic of Ireland	1–1	Portugal	Lansdowne Road, Dublin, Republic of Ireland
	Roy Keane 68'		Figo 79'	Attendance: 35,000; Referee: Knud Erik Fisker (Denmark)

6 June 2001 2002 W.C. Q	Portugal	6–0	Cyprus	Estádio José Alvalade (1956), Lisbon, Portugal
	Pauleta 36', 71'; Barbosa 55', 59'; Pinto 76', 81'			Attendance: 35,000; Referee: Stefano Farina (Italy)

15 August 2001 Friendly	Portugal	3–0	Moldova	Estádio de São Luís, Faro, Portugal
	Figo 43', 58' (pen.), 89' (pen.)			Attendance: 12,000; Referee: Georgios Borovilos (Greece)

1 September 2001 2002 W.C. Q	Andorra	1–7	Portugal	Camp d'Esports, Lleida, Spain
	Jonas 42'		Nuno Gomes 36', 40', 45', 90'; Pauleta 39'; Rui Jorge 45'; Conceição 58'	Attendance: 4,876; Referee: Terje Hauge (Norway)

5 September 2001 2002 W.C. Q	Cyprus	1–3	Portugal	Antonis Papadopoulos Stadium, Larnaca, Cyprus
	Konstantinou 25'		Nuno Gomes 48'; Pauleta 64'; Conceição 71'	Attendance: 2,878; Referee: Karl-Erik Nilsson (Sweden)

6 October 2001 2002 W.C. Q	Portugal	5–0	Estonia	Estádio da Luz, Lisbon, Portugal
	Pinto 30'; Nuno Gomes 50', 60'; Pauleta 59'; Figo 80'			Attendance: 77,000; Referee: Hartmut Strampe (Germany)

14 November 2001 Friendly	Portugal	5–1	Angola	Estádio José Alvalade (1956), Lisbon, Portugal
	Figo 26' (pen.); Nuno Gomes 36', 63'; Andrade 39'; Boa Morte 49'		Mendonça 1'	Attendance: 5,000; Referee: Pascal Garibian (France)

=== 2002 ===
13 February 2002 Friendly	Spain	1–1	Portugal	Estadi Olímpic Lluís Companys, Barcelona, Spain
	Morientes 41'		J. Costa 29'	Attendance: 48,200; Referee: Alexandru Tudor (Romania)

27 March 2002 Friendly	Portugal	1–4	Finland	Estádio do Bessa, Porto, Portugal
	Conceição 40'		Kolkka 9'; Forssell 27'; Litmanen 41', 53'	Attendance: 8,000; Referee: Frank De Bleeckere (Belgium)

17 April 2002 Friendly	Portugal	1–1	Brazil	Estádio José Alvalade (1956), Lisbon, Portugal
	Conceiçao 60'		Ronaldinho 73' (pen.)	Attendance: 44545; Referee: Víctor Esquinas Torres (Spain)

25 May 2002 Friendly	China	0–2	Portugal	Estádio Campo Desportivo, Macau, China
			Nuno Gomes 50'; Pauleta 61'	Attendance: 18,000; Referee: Kwon Jong-Cheol (South Korea)

5 June 2002 2002 W.C. GS	United States	3–2	Portugal	Suwon World Cup Stadium, Suwon, South Korea
09:00 WET	O'Brien 4'; J. Costa 29' (o.g.); McBride 36'		Beto 39'; Agoos 71' (o.g.)	Attendance: 37,306; Referee: Byron Moreno (Ecuador)

10 June 2002 2002 W.C. GS	Portugal	4–0	Poland	Jeonju World Cup Stadium, Jeonju, South Korea
11:30 WET	Pauleta 14', 65', 77'; Rui Costa 88'			Attendance: 31,000; Referee: Hugh Dallas (Scotland)

14 June 2002 2002 W.C. GS	Portugal	0–1	South Korea	Incheon Munhak Stadium, Incheon, South Korea
11:30 WET			Park Ji-sung 70'	Attendance: 50,239; Referee: Ángel Sánchez (Argentina)

7 September 2002 Friendly	England	1–1	Portugal	Villa Park, Birmingham, England
	Smith 40'		Costinha 79'	Attendance: 40,058; Referee: Tom Henning Øvrebø (Norway)

12 October 2002 Friendly	Portugal	1–1	Tunisia	Estádio do Restelo, Lisbon, Portugal
21:15 WET	Pauleta 5'		Zitouni 42'	Referee: Paul Allaerts (Belgium)

16 October 2002 Friendly	Sweden	2–3	Portugal	Ullevi, Gothenburg, Sweden
	Pettersson 6'; Allbäck 24'		Conceição 35' (pen.); Almeida 54'; Rui Costa 89'	Attendance: 30,047; Referee: Kyros Vassaras (Greece)

20 November 2002 Friendly	Portugal	2–0	Scotland	Estádio Primeiro de Maio, Braga, Portugal
	Pauleta 7', 18'			Attendance: 8,000; Referee: Viorel Anghelini (Romania)

=== 2003 ===
12 February 2003 Friendly	Italy	1–0	Portugal	Stadio Luigi Ferraris, Genoa, Italy
19:45 WET	Corradi 62'			Attendance: 31,265; Referee: Herbert Fandel (Germany)

29 March 2003 Friendly	Portugal	2–1	Brazil	Estádio das Antas, Porto, Portugal
21:15 WET	Pauleta 8'; Deco 82'		Ronaldinho 65' (pen.)	Referee: Alon Yefet (Israel)

2 April 2003 Friendly	Portugal	1–0	Macedonia	Stade Olympique de la Pontaise, Lausanne, Switzerland
	Figo 24'			Attendance: 14,258; Referee: Marcus Nobs (Switzerland)

30 April 2003 Friendly	Netherlands	1–1	Portugal	Philips Stadion, Eindhoven, Netherlands
19:15 WET	Kluivert 27'		Simão 78'	Attendance: 22,000; Referee: Urs Meier (Switzerland)

6 June 2003 Friendly	Portugal	0–0	Paraguay	Estádio Primeiro de Maio, Braga, Portugal
21:00 WET				Referee: Giorgos Kasnaferis (Greece)

10 June 2003 Friendly	Portugal	4–0	Bolivia	Estádio Nacional, Lisbon, Portugal
	Andrade 8'; Couto 14'; Postiga 41', 48'			Referee: Asaf Kenan (Israel)

20 August 2003 Friendly	Portugal	1–0	Kazakhstan	Estádio Municipal, Chaves, Portugal
	Simão 65'			Attendance: 8,000; Referee: Julián Rodríguez Santiago (Spain)

6 September 2003 Friendly	Portugal	0–3	Spain	Estádio D. Afonso Henriques, Guimarães, Portugal
21:15 WET			Etxeberria 11'; Joaquín 62'; Tristán 75'	Attendance: 21,176; Referee: Marian Salomir (Romania)

10 September 2003 Friendly	Norway	0–1	Portugal	Ullevaal Stadion, Oslo, Norway
			Pauleta 9'	Attendance: 11,014; Referee: Steve Bennett (England)

11 October 2003 Friendly	Portugal	5–3	Albania	Estádio do Restelo, Lisbon, Portugal
21:15 WET	Figo 8'; Simão 51'; Rui Costa 57'; Pauleta 59'; Miguel 65'		Aliaj 14', 61'; Tare 44'	Attendance: 5,000; Referee: Pascal Garibian (France)

15 November 2003 Friendly	Portugal	1–1	Greece	Estádio Municipal, Aveiro, Portugal
21:15 WET	Pauleta 60'		Lakis 47'	Attendance: 32,000; Referee: Victor Jose Esquinas Torres (Spain)

19 November 2003 Friendly	Portugal	8–0	Kuwait	Estádio Dr. Magalhães Pessoa, Leiria, Portugal
21:15 WET	Pauleta 11', 21', 45+', 53'; Figo 34'; Nuno Gomes 69', 76', 88'			Attendance: 22,000; Referee: Martin Ingvarsson (Sweden)

=== 2004 ===
18 February 2004 Friendly	Portugal	1–1	England	Estádio Algarve, Faro/Loulé, Portugal
	Pauleta 70'		King 47'	Attendance: 27,000; Referee: Viktor Kassai (Hungary)

31 March 2004 Friendly	Portugal	1–2	Italy	Estádio Municipal, Braga, Portugal
20:45 WET	Valente 5'		Vieri 40'; Miccoli 75'	Attendance: 25,000; Referee: Ali Aydin (Turkey)

28 April 2004 Friendly	Portugal	2–2	Sweden	Estádio Cidade, Coimbra, Portugal
21:15 WET	Pauleta 32'; Nuno Gomes 90+'		Källström 17'; Rui Jorge 85' (o.g.)	Attendance: 14,000; Referee: Darko Čeferin (Slovenia)

29 May 2004 Friendly	Portugal	3–0	Luxembourg	Estádio Municipal, Águeda, Portugal
19:15 WET	Figo 13'; Nuno Gomes 28'; Rui Costa 36'			Attendance: 9,000; Referee: Rob Styles (England)

5 June 2004 Friendly	Portugal	4–1	Lithuania	Estádio do Bonfim, Setúbal, Portugal
19:45 WET	Couto 3'; Pauleta 13'; Nuno Gomes 81'; Postiga 90+'		Vencevičius 74' (pen.)	Attendance: 25,000; Referee: Luc Wilmes (Luxembourg)

12 June 2004 2004 EURO GS	Portugal	1–2	Greece	Estádio do Dragão, Porto, Portugal
17:00 WET	Ronaldo 90+3'	Report	Karagounis 7'; Basinas 51' (pen.)	Attendance: 48,761; Referee: Pierluigi Collina (Italy)

16 June 2004 2004 EURO GS	Russia	0–2	Portugal	Estádio da Luz, Lisbon, Portugal
19:45 WET		Report	Maniche 7'; Rui Costa 89'	Attendance: 59,273; Referee: Terje Hauge (Norway)

20 June 2004 2004 EURO GS	Spain	0–1	Portugal	Estádio José Alvalade, Lisbon, Portugal
19:45 WET		Report	Nuno Gomes 57'	Attendance: 47,491; Referee: Anders Frisk (Sweden)

24 June 2004 2004 EURO 1/4	Portugal	2–2 (6–5 p)	England	Estádio da Luz, Lisbon, Portugal
19:45 WET	Postiga 83'; Rui Costa 109'	Report	Owen 3'; Lampard 114'	Attendance: 65,000; Referee: Urs Meier (Switzerland)
	Penalties
	Deco (penalty scored); Simão (penalty scored); Rui Costa (penalty missed); Ronaldo (penalty scored); Maniche (penalty scored); Postiga (penalty scored); Ricardo (penalty scored)		(penalty missed) Beckham; (penalty scored) Owen; (penalty scored) Lampard; (penalty scored) Terry; (penalty scored) Hargreaves; (penalty scored) A. Cole; (penalty missed) Vassell

30 June 2004 2004 EURO 1/2	Portugal	2–1	Netherlands	Estádio José Alvalade, Lisbon, Portugal
19:45 WET	Ronaldo 26'; Maniche 58'	Report	Andrade 63' (o.g.)	Attendance: 46,679; Referee: Anders Frisk (Sweden)

4 July 2004 2004 EURO F	Portugal	0–1	Greece	Estádio da Luz, Lisbon, Portugal
19:45 WET		Report	Charisteas 57'	Attendance: 62,865; Referee: Markus Merk (Germany)

4 September 2004 2006 W.C. Q	Latvia	0–2	Portugal	Skonto Stadium, Riga, Latvia
18:15 WET			Ronaldo 58'; Pauleta 59'	Attendance: 9,500; Referee: Graham Poll (England)

8 September 2004 2006 W.C. Q	Portugal	4–0	Estonia	Estádio Dr. Magalhães Pessoa, Leiria, Portugal
21:15 WET	Ronaldo 75'; Postiga 84', 90+'; Pauleta 87'			Attendance: 27,214; Referee: Bülent Demirlek (Turkey)

9 October 2004 2006 W.C. Q	Liechtenstein	2–2	Portugal	Rheinpark Stadion, Vaduz, Liechtenstein
18:15 WET	Burgmeier 48'; Beck 76'		Pauleta 23'; Hasler 39' (o.g.)	Attendance: 3,548; Referee: Novo Panić (Bosnia and Herzegovina)

13 October 2004 2006 W.C. Q	Portugal	7–1	Russia	Estádio José Alvalade, Lisbon, Portugal
21:15 WET	Pauleta 26'; Ronaldo 39', 69'; Deco 45'; Simão 82'; Petit 89', 90+'		Arshavin 79'	Attendance: 27,258; Referee: Kyros Vassaras (Greece)

17 November 2004 2006 W.C. Q	Luxembourg	0–5	Portugal	Stade Josy Barthel, Luxembourg, Luxembourg
19:00 WET			Bešić 10' (o.g.); Ronaldo 27'; Maniche 52'; Pauleta 67', 83'	Attendance: 8,045; Referee: Vitaliy Godulyan (Ukraine)

=== 2005 ===
9 February 2005 Friendly	Republic of Ireland	1–0	Portugal	Lansdowne Road, Dublin, Republic of Ireland
19:30 WET	O'Brien 20'			Attendance: 44,100; Referee: Matt Messias (England)

26 March 2005 Friendly	Portugal	4–1	Canada	Estádio Cidade de Barcelos, Barcelos, Portugal
20:30 WET	Fernandes 7'; Pauleta 11'; Postiga 81'; Nuno Gomes 90'		McKenna 84'	Attendance: 12,000; Referee: Igor Ishchenko (Ukraine)

30 March 2005 2006 W.C. Q	Slovakia	1–1	Portugal	Tehelné pole, Bratislava, Slovakia
18:00 WET	Karhan 6' (pen.)		Postiga 61'	Attendance: 21,000; Referee: Alain Sars (France)

4 June 2005 2006 W.C. Q	Portugal	2–0	Slovakia	Estádio da Luz, Lisbon, Portugal
19:45 WET	Meira 22'; Ronaldo 42'			Attendance: 64,000; Referee: Pierluigi Collina (Italy)

8 June 2005 2006 W.C. Q	Estonia	0–1	Portugal	A. Le Coq Arena, Tallinn, Estonia
18:15 WET			Ronaldo 33'	Attendance: 10,280; Referee: Mike Riley (England)

17 August 2005 Friendly	Portugal	2–0	Egypt	Estádio de São Miguel, Ponta Delgada, Portugal
21:15 WET	Meira 50'; Postiga 70'			Attendance: 20,000; Referee: Jacek Granat (Poland)

3 September 2005 2006 W.C. Q	Portugal	6–0	Luxembourg	Estádio Algarve, Faro/Loulé, Portugal
21:15 WET	Andrade 24'; Carvalho 30'; Pauleta 37', 55'; Simão 79', 84'			Attendance: 25,300; Referee: Dick van Egmond (Netherlands)

7 September 2005 2006 W.C. Q	Russia	0–0	Portugal	Lokomotiv Stadium, Moscow, Russia
16:00 WET				Attendance: 28,800; Referee: Markus Merk (Germany)

8 October 2005 2006 W.C. Q	Portugal	2–1	Liechtenstein	Estádio Municipal, Aveiro, Portugal
21:15 WET	Pauleta 48'; Nuno Gomes 85'		Fischer 32'	Attendance: 29,000; Referee: Grzegorz Gilewski (Poland)

12 October 2005 2006 W.C. Q	Portugal	3–0	Latvia	Estádio do Dragão, Porto, Portugal
19:30 WET	Pauleta 18', 20'; Viana 85'			Attendance: 35,000; Referee: Peter Fröjdfeldt (Sweden)

12 November 2005 Friendly	Portugal	2–0	Croatia	Estádio Cidade, Coimbra, Portugal
21:15 WET	Petit 32'; Pauleta 65'			Attendance: 16,370; Referee: Kim Nielsen (Denmark)

15 November 2005 Friendly	Northern Ireland	1–1	Portugal	Windsor Park, Belfast, Northern Ireland
19:45 WET	Feeney 53'		Craigan 40' (o.g.)	Attendance: 20,000; Referee: Howard Webb (England)

=== 2006 ===
1 March 2006 Friendly	Saudi Arabia	0–3	Portugal	Esprit Arena, Düsseldorf, Germany
19:45 WET			Ronaldo 29', 84'; Maniche 44'	Referee: Wolfgang Stark (Germany)

27 May 2006 Friendly	Portugal	4–1	Cape Verde	Complexo Desportivo da Silveirinha, Évora, Portugal
18:00 WET	Pauleta 1', 37', 84'; Petit 59'		Meira 21' (o.g.)	Referee: Dick van Egmond (Netherlands)

3 June 2006 Friendly	Luxembourg	0–3	Portugal	Stade Saint-Symphorien, Metz, France
			Simão 46', 73'; Figo 84'	Attendance: 19,159; Referee: Laurent Duhamel (France)

11 June 2006 2006 W.C. GS	Angola	0–1	Portugal	FIFA World Cup Stadium Cologne, Cologne, Germany
20:00 WET			Pauleta 4'	Attendance: 45,000; Referee: Jorge Larrionda (Uruguay)

17 June 2006 2006 W.C. GS	Portugal	2–0	Iran	FIFA World Cup Stadium, Frankfurt, Frankfurt, Germany
14:00 WET	Deco 63'; Ronaldo 80' (pen.)			Attendance: 48,000; Referee: Éric Poulat (France)

21 June 2006 2006 W.C. GS	Portugal	2–1	Mexico	FIFA World Cup Stadium, Gelsenkirchen, Gelsenkirchen, Germany
15:00 WET	Maniche 6'; Simão 24' (pen.)		Fonseca 29'	Attendance: 52,000; Referee: Ľuboš Micheľ (Slovakia)

25 June 2006 2006 W.C. 1/8	Portugal	1–0	Netherlands	Frankenstadion, Nuremberg, Germany
20:00 WET	Maniche 23'; Costinha 45+1'; Deco 78'		Boulahrouz 63' van Bronckhorst 90+5'	Attendance: 41,000; Referee: Valentin Ivanov (Russia)

1 July 2006 2006 W.C. 1/4	England	0–0 (1–3 p)	Portugal	FIFA World Cup Stadium, Gelsenkirchen, Gelsenkirchen, Germany
16:00 WET	Rooney (red card) 62'			Attendance: 52,000; Referee: Horacio Elizondo (Argentina)
	Penalties
	Lampard (penalty missed); Hargreaves (penalty scored); Gerrard (penalty missed); Carragher (penalty missed)		(penalty scored) Simão; (penalty missed) Viana; (penalty missed) Petit; (penalty scored) Postiga; (penalty scored) Ronaldo

5 July 2006 2006 W.C. 1/2	Portugal	0–1	France	FIFA World Cup Stadium Munich, Munich, Germany
20:00 WET			Zidane 33' (pen.)	Attendance: 66,000; Referee: Jorge Larrionda (Uruguay)

8 July 2006 2006 W.C. 3-4	Germany	3–1	Portugal	Gottlieb-Daimler-Stadion, Stuttgart, Germany
20:00 WET	Schweinsteiger 56', 78'; Petit 61' (o.g.)		Nuno Gomes 88'	Attendance: 52,000; Referee: Toru Kamikawa (Japan)

1 September 2006 Friendly	Denmark	4–2	Portugal	Brøndby Stadium, Copenhagen, Denmark
19:00 WET	Tomasson 15'; Kahlenberg 21'; Jørgensen 78'; Bendtner 90'		Carvalho 17'; Nani 66'	Attendance: 13,186; Referee: Alan Kelly (Republic of Ireland)

6 September 2006 2008 EURO Q	Finland	1–1	Portugal	Olympic Stadium, Helsinki, Finland
18:00 WET	Johansson 22'		Nuno Gomes 42'	Attendance: 38,015; Referee: Konrad Plautz (Austria)

7 October 2006 2008 EURO Q	Portugal	3–0	Azerbaijan	Estádio do Bessa XXI, Porto, Portugal
21:00 WET	Ronaldo 25', 63'; Carvalho 31'			Attendance: 20,000; Referee: Mark Halsey (England)

11 October 2006 2008 EURO Q	Poland	2–1	Portugal	Silesian Stadium, Chorzów, Poland
19:30 WET	Smolarek 9', 18'		Nuno Gomes 89'	Attendance: 40,000; Referee: Wolfgang Stark (Germany)

15 November 2006 2008 EURO Q	Portugal	3–0	Kazakhstan	Estádio Cidade, Coimbra, Portugal
21:00 WET	Simão 8', 86'; Ronaldo 30'			Attendance: 27,000; Referee: René Rogalla (Switzerland)

=== 2007 ===
6 February 2007 Friendly	Brazil	0–2	Portugal	Emirates Stadium, London, England
20:00 WET			Simão 82'; Carvalho 89'	Attendance: 59,793; Referee: Martin Atkinson (England)

24 March 2007 2008 EURO Q	Portugal	4–0	Belgium	Estádio José Alvalade, Lisbon, Portugal
21:00 WET	Nuno Gomes 52'; Ronaldo 54', 74'; Quaresma 68'			Attendance: 47,009; Referee: Kyros Vassaras (Greece)

28 March 2007 2008 EURO Q	Serbia	1–1	Portugal	Stadion FK Crvena Zvezda, Belgrade, Serbia
19:30 WET	Janković 37'		Tiago 4'	Attendance: 55,000; Referee: Bertrand Layec (France)

2 June 2007 2008 EURO Q	Belgium	1–2	Portugal	King Baudouin Stadium, Brussels, Belgium
19:45 WET	Fellaini 55'		Nani 43'; Postiga 64'	Attendance: 45,585; Referee: Martin Hansson (Sweden)

5 June 2007 Friendly	Kuwait	1–1	Portugal	Thamir Stadium, Al Salmiya, Kuwait
19:00 WET	Laheeb 87'		Tomás 72'	Referee: Fareed Al-Marzooqi (United Arab Emirates)

22 August 2007 2008 EURO Q	Armenia	1–1	Portugal	Hanrapetakan Stadium, Yerevan, Armenia
17:00 WET	Arzumanyan 11'		Ronaldo 37'	Attendance: 15,550; Referee: Claus Bo Larsen (Denmark)

8 September 2007 2008 EURO Q	Portugal	2–2	Poland	Estádio da Luz, Lisbon, Portugal
21:00 WET	Maniche 49'; Ronaldo 73'		Lewandowski 44'; Krzynówek 87'	Attendance: 55,000; Referee: Roberto Rosetti (Italy)

12 September 2007 2008 EURO Q	Portugal	1–1	Serbia	Estádio José Alvalade, Lisbon, Portugal
21:00 WET	Simão 11'		Ivanović 87'	Attendance: 47,000; Referee: Markus Merk (Germany)

13 October 2007 2008 EURO Q	Azerbaijan	0–2	Portugal	Tofiq Bahramov Stadium, Baku, Azerbaijan
17:00 WET			Alves 12'; Almeida 45'	Attendance: 30,000; Referee: Ivan Bebek (Croatia)

17 October 2007 2008 EURO Q	Kazakhstan	1–2	Portugal	Almaty Central Stadium, Almaty, Kazakhstan
15:00 WET	Byakov 90+5'		Makukula 84'; Ronaldo 90+1'	Attendance: 25,000; Referee: Jan Wegereef (Netherlands)

17 November 2007 2008 EURO Q	Portugal	1–0	Armenia	Estádio Dr. Magalhães Pessoa, Leiria, Portugal
21:00 WET	Almeida 40'			Attendance: 23,000; Referee: Mike Riley (England)

21 November 2007 2008 EURO Q	Portugal	0–0	Finland	Estádio do Dragão, Porto, Portugal
19:45 WET				Attendance: 50,000; Referee: Ľuboš Micheľ (Slovakia)

=== 2008 ===
6 February 2008 Friendly	Italy	3–1	Portugal	Letzigrund, Zürich, Switzerland
19:45 WET	Toni 45+1'; Cannavaro 50'; Quagliarella 78'		Quaresma 77'	Attendance: 30,500; Referee: Sascha Kever (Switzerland)

26 March 2008 Friendly	Portugal	1–2	Greece	Esprit Arena, Düsseldorf, Germany
19:30 WET	Nuno Gomes 75'		Karagounis 34', 60'	Attendance: 20,000; Referee: Knut Kircher (Germany)

31 May 2008 Friendly	Portugal	2–0	Georgia	Estádio do Fontelo, Viseu, Portugal
18:15 WET	Moutinho 19'; Simão 45' (pen.)			Attendance: 8,500; Referee: Levir Meir (Israel)

7 June 2008 2008 EURO GS	Portugal	2–0	Turkey	Stade de Genève, Geneva, Switzerland
19:45 WET	Pepe 61'; Meireles 90+3'			Attendance: 29,106; Referee: Herbert Fandel (Germany)

11 June 2008 2008 EURO GS	Czech Republic	1–3	Portugal	Stade de Genève, Geneva, Switzerland
17:00 WET	Sionko 17'		Deco 8'; Ronaldo 63'; Quaresma 90+1'	Attendance: 29,016; Referee: Kyros Vassaras (Greece)

15 June 2008 2008 EURO GS	Switzerland	2–0	Portugal	St. Jakob-Park, Basel, Switzerland
19:45 WET	Yakin 71', 83' (pen.)			Attendance: 39,730; Referee: Konrad Plautz (Austria)

19 June 2008 2008 EURO 1/4	Portugal	2–3	Germany	St. Jakob-Park, Basel, Switzerland
19:45 WET	Nuno Gomes 40'; Postiga 87'		Schweinsteiger 22'; Klose 26'; Ballack 61'	Attendance: 39,374; Referee: Peter Fröjdfeldt (Sweden)

20 August 2008 Friendly	Portugal	5–0	Faroe Islands	Estádio Municipal, Aveiro, Portugal
20:45 WET	Martins 23'; Simão 48'; Duda 86'; Alves 89'; Nani 90+1'			Attendance: 21,000; Referee: Andriy Shandor (Ukraine)

6 September 2008 2010 W.C. Q	Malta	0–4	Portugal	Ta' Qali National Stadium, Ta' Qali, Malta
19:00 WET			Said 35' (o.g.); Almeida 61'; Simão 71'; Nani 74'	Attendance: 11,000; Referee: Kevin Blom (Netherlands)

10 September 2008 2010 W.C. Q	Portugal	2–3	Denmark	Estádio José Alvalade, Lisbon, Portugal
20:45 WET	Nani 42'; Deco 86' (pen.)		Bendtner 84'; Poulsen 90+1'; Jensen 90+3'	Attendance: 33,000; Referee: Howard Webb (England)

11 October 2008 2010 W.C. Q	Sweden	0–0	Portugal	Råsunda Stadium, Solna, Sweden
19:00 WET				Attendance: 33,241; Referee: Roberto Rosetti (Italy)

15 October 2008 2010 W.C. Q	Portugal	0–0	Albania	Estádio Municipal, Braga, Portugal
20:45 WET				Attendance: 29,500; Referee: Knut Kircher (Germany)

19 November 2008 Friendly	Brazil	6–2	Portugal	Bezerrão, Gama, Brazil
00:00 WET	Luís Fabiano 9', 25', 58'; Maicon 56'; Elano 65'; Adriano 90'		Danny 4'; Simão 62'	Referee: Jorge Larrionda (Uruguay)

=== 2009 ===
11 February 2009 Friendly	Portugal	1–0	Finland	Estádio Algarve, Faro/Loulé, Portugal
20:45 WET	Ronaldo 78' (pen.)			Attendance: 19,834; Referee: Carlos Bertolini (Switzerland)

28 March 2009 2010 W.C. Q	Portugal	0–0	Sweden	Estádio do Dragão, Porto, Portugal
20:45 WET				Attendance: 40,200; Referee: Frank De Bleeckere (Belgium)

31 March 2009 Friendly	Portugal	2–0	South Africa	Stade Olympique de la Pontaise, Lausanne, Switzerland
19:45 WET	Alves 4'; Edinho 56'			Attendance: 14,659; Referee: Massimo Busacca (Switzerland)

6 June 2009 2010 W.C. Q	Albania	1–2	Portugal	Qemal Stafa Stadium, Tirana, Albania
19:45 WET	Bogdani 29'		Almeida 28'; Alves 90+3'	Attendance: 13,320; Referee: Florian Meyer (Germany)

10 June 2009 Friendly	Estonia	0–0	Portugal	A. Le Coq Arena, Tallinn, Estonia
19:30 WET				Attendance: 5,000; Referee: Michael Svendsen (Denmark)

12 August 2009 Friendly	Liechtenstein	0–3	Portugal	Rheinpark Stadion, Vaduz, Liechtenstein
19:30 WET			Almeida 14', 25'; Meireles 22'	Attendance: 6,000; Referee: Carlo Bertolini (Switzerland)

5 September 2009 2010 W.C. Q	Denmark	1–1	Portugal	Parken Stadium, Copenhagen, Denmark
19:00 WET	Bendtner 41'		Liédson 85'	Attendance: 37,998; Referee: Massimo Busacca (Switzerland)

9 September 2009 2010 W.C. Q	Hungary	0–1	Portugal	Puskás Ferenc Stadium, Budapest, Hungary
19:45 WET			Pepe 9'	Attendance: 42,000; Referee: Stéphane Lannoy (France)

10 October 2009 2010 W.C. Q	Portugal	3–0	Hungary	Estádio da Luz, Lisbon, Portugal
20:45 WET	Simão 18', 79'; Liédson 74'			Attendance: 50,115; Referee: Alain Hamer (Luxembourg)

14 October 2009 2010 W.C. Q	Portugal	4–0	Malta	Estádio D. Afonso Henriques, Guimarães, Portugal
19:45 WET	Nani 14'; Simão 45'; Veloso 52'; Edinho 89'			Attendance: 29,350; Referee: Alan Kelly (Republic of Ireland)

14 November 2009 2010 W.C. P-O	Portugal	1–0	Bosnia and Herzegovina	Estádio da Luz, Lisbon, Portugal
20:30 WET	Alves 31'			Attendance: 60,588; Referee: Martin Atkinson (England)

18 November 2009 2010 W.C. P-O	Bosnia and Herzegovina	0–1 (0–2 agg.)	Portugal	Bilino Polje, Zenica, Bosnia and Herzegovina
19:45 WET			Meireles 56'	Attendance: 15,000; Referee: Roberto Rosetti (Italy)

== 2010s ==
=== 2010 ===
3 March 2010 Friendly	Portugal	2–0	China	Coimbra, Portugal
20:45 WET(UTC±0)	Almeida 36'; Liédson 90+4'	Report		Stadium: Estádio Cidade; Attendance: 25,000; Referee: Djamel Haimoudi (Algeria)

24 May 2010 Friendly	Portugal	0–0	Cape Verde	Covilhã, Portugal
19:30 WEST (UTC+1)		Report		Stadium: Complexo Desportivo; Attendance: 2,000; Referee: Carlos Clos Gómez (Spain)

1 June 2010 Friendly	Portugal	3–1	Cameroon	Covilhã, Portugal
19:30 WEST (UTC+1)	Meireles 32', 47'; Nani 82'	Report	Webó 68'	Stadium: Complexo Desportivo; Attendance: 3,000; Referee: Michael Weiner (Germany)

8 June 2010 Friendly	Mozambique	0–3	Portugal	Johannesburg, South Africa
16:30 SAST (UTC+2)		Report	Danny 52'; Almeida 75', 83'	Stadium: Wanderers Stadium; Attendance: 34,000; Referee: Matthew Dyer (South Africa)

15 June 2010 2010 FWC GS	Ivory Coast	0–0	Portugal	Port Elizabeth, South Africa
16:00 SAST (UTC+2)		Report		Stadium: Nelson Mandela Bay Stadium; Attendance: 37,034; Referee: Jorge Larrionda (Uruguay)

21 June 2010 2010 FWC GS	Portugal	7–0	North Korea	Cape Town, South Africa
13:30 SAST (UTC+2)	Meireles 29'; Simão 53'; Almeida 56'; Tiago 60', 89'; Liédson 80'; Ronaldo 87'	Report		Stadium: Cape Town Stadium; Attendance: 63,644; Referee: Pablo Pozo (Chile)

25 June 2010 2010 FWC GS	Portugal	0–0	Brazil	Durban, South Africa
16:00 SAST (UTC+2)		Report		Stadium: Moses Mabhida Stadium; Attendance: 62,712; Referee: Benito Archundia (Mexico)

29 June 2010 2010 FWC R16	Spain	1–0	Portugal	Cape Town, South Africa
20:30 SAST (UTC+2)	Villa 63'	Report		Stadium: Cape Town Stadium; Attendance: 62,955; Referee: Héctor Baldassi (Argentina)

3 September 2010 2012 EURO Q	Portugal	4–4	Cyprus	Guimarães, Portugal
20:45 WEST (UTC+1)	Almeida 8'; Meireles 28'; Danny 50'; Fernandes 60'	Report	Aloneftis 3'; Konstantinou 10'; Okkas 57'; Avraam 89'	Stadium: Estádio D. Afonso Henriques; Attendance: 9,100; Referee: Mark Clattenburg (England)

7 September 2010 2012 EURO Q	Norway	1–0	Portugal	Oslo, Norway
20:30 CEST (UTC+2)	Huseklepp 21'	Report		Stadium: Ullevaal Stadion; Attendance: 24,535; Referee: Laurent Duhamel (France)

8 October 2010 2012 EURO Q	Portugal	3–1	Denmark	Porto, Portugal
20:45 WEST (UTC+1)	Nani 29', 31'; Ronaldo 85'	Report	Carvalho 79' (o.g.)	Stadium: Estádio do Dragão; Attendance: 27,117; Referee: Eric Braamhaar (Netherlands)

12 October 2010 2012 EURO Q	Iceland	1–3	Portugal	Reykjavík, Iceland
19:45 GMT (UTC±0)	Hulguson 18'	Report	Ronaldo 3'; Meireles 27'; Postiga 72'	Stadium: Laugardalsvöllur; Attendance: 9,767; Referee: Thomas Einwaller (Austria)

17 November 2010 Friendly	Portugal	4–0	Spain	Lisbon, Portugal
21:00 WET (UTC±0)	Martins 45'; Postiga 49', 68'; Almeida 90+3'	Report		Stadium: Estádio da Luz; Attendance: 30,588; Referee: Antony Gautier (France)

=== 2011 ===
9 February 2011 Friendly	Argentina	2–1	Portugal	Geneva, Switzerland
21:00 CET (UTC+1)	Di María 14'; Messi 90' (pen.)	Report	Ronaldo 21'	Stadium: Stade de Genève; Attendance: 30,000; Referee: Massimo Busacca (Switzerland)

26 March 2011 Friendly	Portugal	1–1	Chile	Leiria, Portugal
20:45 WET (UTC±0)	Varela 16'	Report	Fernández 42'	Stadium: Estádio Dr. Magalhães Pessoa; Attendance: 10,694; Referee: Kevin Blom (Netherlands)

29 March 2011 Friendly	Portugal	2–0	Finland	Aveiro, Portugal
20:45 WET (UTC±0)	Micael 10', 71'	Report		Stadium: Estádio Municipal; Attendance: 13,737; Referee: Stephane Studer (Switzerland)

4 June 2011 2012 EURO Q	Portugal	1–0	Norway	Lisbon, Portugal
21:00 WEST (UTC+1)	Postiga 53'	Report		Stadium: Estádio da Luz; Attendance: 47,829; Referee: Cüneyt Çakır (Turkey)

10 August 2011 Friendly	Portugal	5–0	Luxembourg	Faro/Loulé, Portugal
21:00 WEST (UTC+1)	Postiga 26'; Ronaldo 44'; Coentrão 47'; Almeida 59', 73'	Report		Stadium: Estádio Algarve; Attendance: 21,283; Referee: Antonio Mateu Lahoz (Spain)

2 September 2011 2012 EURO Q	Cyprus	0–4	Portugal	Nicosia, Cyprus
21:45 EEST (UTC+3)		Report	Ronaldo 35' (pen.), 82'; Almeida 84'; Danny 90+2'	Stadium: GSP Stadium; Attendance: 15,444; Referee: Gianluca Rocchi (Italy)

7 October 2011 2012 EURO Q	Portugal	5–3	Iceland	Porto, Portugal
21:00 WEST (UTC+1)	Nani 13', 21'; Postiga 45'; Moutinho 81'; Eliseu 87'	Report	Jónasson 48', 67'; Sigurðsson 90+4' (pen.)	Stadium: Estádio do Dragão; Attendance: 35,715; Referee: Bas Nijhuis (Netherlands)

11 October 2011 2012 EURO Q	Denmark	2–1	Portugal	Copenhagen, Denmark
20:15 CEST (UTC+2)	Krohn-Dehli 13'; Bendtner 63'	Report	Ronaldo 90+2'	Stadium: Parken Stadium; Attendance: 37,012; Referee: Nicola Rizzoli (Italy)

11 November 2011 2012 EURO Q PO	Bosnia and Herzegovina	0–0	Portugal	Zenica, Bosnia and Herzegovina
20:00 CET (UTC+1)		Report		Stadium: Bilino Polje; Attendance: 12,352; Referee: Howard Webb (England)

15 November 2011 2012 EURO Q PO	Portugal	6–2 (6–2 agg.)	Bosnia and Herzegovina	Lisbon, Portugal
21:00 WET (UTC±0)	Ronaldo 8', 53'; Nani 24'; Postiga 72', 82'; Veloso 80'	Report	Misimović 41' (pen.); Spahić 65'	Stadium: Estádio da Luz; Attendance: 47,728; Referee: Wolfgang Stark (Germany)

=== 2012 ===
29 February 2012 Friendly	Poland	0–0	Portugal	Warsaw, Poland
20:45 CET (UTC+1)		Report		Stadium: National Stadium; Attendance: 53,179; Referee: Alon Yefet (Israel)

26 May 2012 Friendly	Portugal	0–0	Macedonia	Leiria, Portugal
17:00 WEST (UTC+1)		Report		Stadium: Estádio Dr. Magalhães Pessoa; Attendance: 19,332; Referee: Alan Kelly (Ireland)

2 June 2012 Friendly	Portugal	1–3	Turkey	Lisbon, Portugal
19:45 WEST (UTC+1)	Nani 57'	Report	Bulut 35', 52'; Pepe 88' (o.g.)	Stadium: Estádio da Luz; Attendance: 62,000; Referee: Stephan Studer (Switzerland)

9 June 2012 2012 EURO GS	Germany	1–0	Portugal	Lviv, Ukraine
21:45 EEST (UTC+3)	Gómez 72'	Report		Stadium: Arena Lviv; Attendance: 32,990; Referee: Stéphane Lannoy (France)

13 June 2012 2012 EURO GS	Denmark	2–3	Portugal	Lviv, Ukraine
19:00 EEST (UTC+3)	Bendtner 41', 80'	Report	Pepe 24'; Postiga 36'; Varela 87'	Stadium: Arena Lviv; Attendance: 31,840; Referee: Craig Thomson (Scotland)

17 June 2012 2012 EURO GS	Portugal	2–1	Netherlands	Kharkiv, Ukraine
21:45 EEST (UTC+3)	Ronaldo 28', 74'	Report	Van der Vaart 11'	Stadium: Metalist Stadium; Attendance: 37,445; Referee: Nicola Rizzoli (Italy)

21 June 2012 2012 EURO QF	Czech Republic	0–1	Portugal	Warsaw, Poland
20:45 CEST (UTC+2)		Report	Ronaldo 79'	Stadium: National Stadium; Attendance: 55,590; Referee: Howard Webb (England)

27 June 2012 2012 EURO SF	Portugal	0–0 (a.e.t.) (2–4 p)	Spain	Donetsk, Ukraine
21:45 EEST (UTC+3)		Report		Stadium: Donbas Arena; Attendance: 48,000; Referee: Cüneyt Çakır (Turkey)
	Penalties
	Moutinho (penalty missed); Pepe (penalty scored); Nani (penalty scored); Alves (penalty missed)		(penalty missed) Alonso; (penalty scored) Iniesta; (penalty scored) Piqué; (penalty scored) Ramos; (penalty scored) Fàbregas

15 August 2012 Friendly	Portugal	2–0	Panama	Faro, Portugal
21:00 WEST (UTC+1)	Oliveira 30'; Ronaldo 51'	Report		Stadium: Estádio Algarve; Attendance: 24,181; Referee: César Muñiz Fernández (Spain)

7 September 2012 2014 FWC Q	Luxembourg	1–2	Portugal	Luxembourg City, Luxembourg
20:45 CEST (UTC+2)	da Mota 14'	Report	Ronaldo 27'; Postiga 54'	Stadium: Stade Josy Barthel; Attendance: 8,125; Referee: Kristo Tohver (Estonia)

11 September 2012 2014 FWC Q	Portugal	3–0	Azerbaijan	Braga, Portugal
20:15 WEST (UTC+1)	Varela 64'; Postiga 85'; Alves 88'	Report		Stadium: Estádio Municipal de Braga; Attendance: 29,971; Referee: Szymon Marciniak (Poland)

12 October 2012 2014 FWC Q	Russia	1–0	Portugal	Moscow, Russia
19:00 MSD (UTC+4)	Kerzhakov 6'	Report		Stadium: Luzhniki Stadium; Attendance: 54,212; Referee: Viktor Kassai (Hungary)

16 October 2012 2014 FWC Q	Portugal	1–1	Northern Ireland	Porto, Portugal
20:45 WEST (UTC+1)	Postiga 79'	Report	McGinn 30'	Stadium: Estádio do Dragão; Attendance: 48,711; Referee: Thorsten Kinhöfer (Germany)

14 November 2012 Friendly	Gabon	2–2	Portugal	Libreville, Gabon
20:30 WAT (UTC+1)	Madinda 33' (pen.); Poko 69' (pen.)	Report	Pizzi 35' (pen.); Almeida 60'	Stadium: Stade d'Angondjé; Referee: Joseph Lamptey (Ghana)

=== 2013 ===
6 February 2013 Friendly	Portugal	2–3	Ecuador	Guimarães, Portugal
20:45 WET (UTC±0)	Ronaldo 23'; Postiga 60'	Report	Valencia 2'; Pereira 61' (o.g.); Caicedo 70'	Stadium: Estádio D. Afonso Henriques; Attendance: 20,288; Referee: Marijo Strahonja (Croatia)

22 March 2013 2014 FWC Q	Israel	3–3	Portugal	Ramat Gan, Israel
14:45 IST (UTC+2)	Hemed 24'; Ben Basat 40'; Gershon 70'	Report	Alves 2'; Postiga 72'; Coentrão 90+3'	Stadium: Ramat Gan Stadium; Attendance: 41,583; Referee: Stéphane Lannoy (France)

26 March 2013 2014 FWC Q	Azerbaijan	0–2	Portugal	Baku, Azerbaijan
21:00 AZT (UTC+4)		Report	Alves 63'; Almeida 79'	Stadium: Tofiq Bahramov Stadium; Attendance: 24,558; Referee: Andre Marriner (England)

7 June 2013 2014 FWC Q	Portugal	1–0	Russia	Lisbon, Portugal
19:45 WEST (UTC+1)	Postiga 9'	Report		Stadium: Estádio da Luz; Attendance: 54,697; Referee: Damir Skomina (Slovenia)

10 June 2013 Friendly	Croatia	0–1	Portugal	Geneva, Switzerland
19:30 CEST (UTC+2)		Report	Ronaldo 36'	Stadium: Stade de Genève; Attendance: 13,334; Referee: Stephan Studer (Switzerland)

14 August 2013 Friendly	Portugal	1–1	Netherlands	Faro, Portugal
20:30 WEST (UTC+1)	Ronaldo 87'	Report	Strootman 17'	Stadium: Estádio Algarve; Attendance: 29,021; Referee: Paolo Mazzoleni (Italy)

6 September 2013 2014 FWC Q	Northern Ireland	2–4	Portugal	Belfast, Northern Ireland
19:45 BST (UTC+1)	McAuley 36'; Ward 52'	Report	Alves 21'; Ronaldo 68', 77', 83'	Stadium: Windsor Park; Attendance: 12,001; Referee: Danny Makkelie (Netherlands)

9 September 2013 Friendly	Portugal	1–3	Brazil	Foxborough, United States
21:00 EDT (UTC-4)	Meireles 17'	Report	Silva 24'; Neymar 34'; Jô 49'	Stadium: Gillette Stadium; Attendance: 62,310; Referee: Juan Guzmán (United States)

11 October 2013 2014 FWC Q	Portugal	1–1	Israel	Lisbon, Portugal
20:45 WEST (UTC+1)	Costa 27'	Report	Ben Basat 85'	Stadium: Estádio José Alvalade; Attendance: 48,317; Referee: Tom Harald Hagen (Norway)

15 October 2013 2014 FWC Q	Portugal	3–0	Luxembourg	Coimbra, Portugal
18:00 WEST (UTC+1)	Varela 30'; Nani 36'; Postiga 78'	Report		Stadium: Estádio Cidade de Coimbra; Attendance: 18,955; Referee: Bülent Yıldırım (Turkey)

15 November 2013 2014 FWC Q PO	Portugal	1–0	Sweden	Lisbon, Portugal
19:45 WET (UTC±0)	Ronaldo 82'	Report		Stadium: Estádio da Luz; Attendance: 61,467; Referee: Nicola Rizzoli (Italy)

19 November 2013 2014 FWC Q PO	Sweden	2–3 (2–4 agg.)	Portugal	Solna, Sweden
20:45 CET (UTC+1)	Ibrahimović 68', 72'	Report	Ronaldo 50', 77', 79'	Stadium: Friends Arena; Attendance: 49,766; Referee: Howard Webb (England)

=== 2014 ===
5 March 2014 Friendly	Portugal	5–1	Cameroon	Leiria, Portugal
20:45 WET (UTC±0)	Ronaldo 21', 83'; Meireles 66'; Coentrão 67'; Edinho 77'	Report	Aboubakar 43'	Stadium: Estádio Dr. Magalhães Pessoa; Attendance: 21,335; Referee: Andre Marriner (England)

31 May 2014 Friendly	Portugal	0–0	Greece	Oeiras, Portugal
19:30 WEST (UTC+1)		Report		Stadium: Estádio Nacional; Attendance: 33,556; Referee: Kevin Blom (Netherlands)

6 June 2014 Friendly	Mexico	0–1	Portugal	Foxborough, United States
20:30 EDT (UTC−4)		Report	Alves 90+3'	Stadium: Gillette Stadium; Attendance: 56,292; Referee: Jeffrey Solis (Costa Rica)

10 June 2014 Friendly	Republic of Ireland	1–5	Portugal	East Rutherford, United States
19:45 EDT (UTC−4)	McClean 52'	Report	Almeida 2', 37'; Keogh 20' (o.g.); Vieirinha 77'; Coentrão 83'	Stadium: MetLife Stadium; Attendance: 46,063; Referee: Baldomero Toledo (United States)

16 June 2014 2014 FWC GS	Germany	4–0	Portugal	Salvador, Brazil
13:00 BRT (UTC−3)	Müller 12' (pen.), 45+1', 78'; Hummels 32'	Report		Stadium: Arena Fonte Nova; Attendance: 51,081; Referee: Milorad Mažić (Serbia)

22 June 2014 2014 FWC GS	United States	2–2	Portugal	Manaus, Brazil
18:00 AMT (UTC−4)	Jones 64'; Dempsey 81'	Report	Nani 5'; Varela 90+5'	Stadium: Arena Amazônia; Attendance: 40,123; Referee: Néstor Pitana (Argentina)

26 June 2014 2014 FWC GS	Portugal	2–1	Ghana	Brasília, Brazil
13:00 BRT (UTC−3)	Boye 31' (o.g.); Ronaldo 80'	Report	Gyan 57'	Stadium: Estádio Nacional Mané Garrincha; Attendance: 67,540; Referee: Nawaf Shukralla (Bahrain)

7 September 2014 2016 EURO Q	Portugal	0–1	Albania	Aveiro, Portugal
19:45 WEST (UTC+1)		Report	Balaj 52'	Stadium: Estádio Municipal de Aveiro; Attendance: 23,205; Referee: Ruddy Buquet (France)

11 October 2014 Friendly	France	2–1	Portugal	Saint-Denis, France
20:45 CEST (UTC+2)	Benzema 3'; Pogba 69'	Report	Quaresma 77' (pen.)	Stadium: Stade de France; Attendance: 75,000; Referee: Szymon Marciniak (Poland)

14 October 2014 2016 EURO Q	Denmark	0–1	Portugal	Copenhagen, Denmark
20:45 CEST (UTC+2)		Report	Ronaldo 90+5'	Stadium: Telia Parken; Attendance: 36,562; Referee: Felix Brych (Germany)

14 November 2014 2016 EURO Q	Portugal	1–0	Armenia	Faro, Portugal
19:45 WET (UTC±0)	Ronaldo 72'	Report		Stadium: Estádio Algarve; Attendance: 21,042; Referee: Anastasios Sidiropoulos (Greece)

18 November 2014 Friendly	Argentina	0–1	Portugal	Manchester, England
19:45 GMT (UTC±0)			Guerreiro 90+1'	Stadium: Old Trafford; Attendance: 41,233; Referee: Martin Atkinson (England)

=== 2015 ===
29 March 2015 2016 EURO Q	Portugal	2–1	Serbia	Lisbon, Portugal
19:45 WEST (UTC+1)	Carvalho 10'; Coentrão 63'	Report	Matić 61'	Stadium: Estádio da Luz; Attendance: 58,430; Referee: Gianluca Rocchi (Italy)

31 March 2015 Friendly	Portugal	0–2	Cape Verde	Estoril, Portugal
20:45 WEST (UTC+1)		Report	Fortes 38'; Gegé 43'	Stadium: Estádio António Coimbra da Mota; Attendance: 15,000; Referee: Ovidiu Haţegan (Romania)

13 June 2015 2016 EURO Q	Armenia	2–3	Portugal	Yerevan, Armenia
20:00 AMT (UTC+4)	Pizzelli 14'; Mkoyan 72'	Report	Ronaldo 29' (pen.), 55', 58'	Stadium: Republican Stadium; Attendance: 14,527; Referee: Serge Gumienny (Belgium)

16 June 2015 Friendly	Portugal	1–0	Italy	Genève, Switzerland
20:30 CEST (UTC+2)	Éder 52'	Report		Stadium: Stade de Genève; Attendance: 18,024; Referee: Stephan Studer (Switzerland)

4 September 2015 Friendly	Portugal	0–1	France	Lisbon, Portugal
19:45 WEST (UTC+1)		Report	Valbuena 85'	Stadium: Estádio José Alvalade; Attendance: 39,853; Referee: Danny Makkelie (Netherlands)

7 September 2015 2016 EURO Q	Albania	0–1	Portugal	Elbasan, Albania
20:45 CEST (UTC+2)		Report	Veloso 90+2'	Stadium: Elbasan Arena; Attendance: 12,121; Referee: Jonas Eriksson (Sweden)

8 October 2015 2016 EURO Q	Portugal	1–0	Denmark	Braga, Portugal
19:45 WEST (UTC+1)	Moutinho 66'	Report		Stadium: Estádio Municipal de Braga; Attendance: 29,860; Referee: Mark Clattenburg (England)

11 October 2015 2016 EURO Q	Serbia	1–2	Portugal	Belgrade, Serbia
18:00 CEST (UTC+2)	Tošić 65'	Report	Nani 5'; Moutinho 78'	Stadium: Partizan Stadium; Attendance: 7,485; Referee: David Fernández Borbalán (Spain)

14 November 2015 Friendly	Russia	1–0	Portugal	Krasnodar, Russia
17:00 MSK (UTC+3)	Shirokov 89'	Report		Stadium: Kuban Stadium; Attendance: 32,000; Referee: Milorad Mažić (Serbia)

17 November 2015 Friendly	Luxembourg	0–2	Portugal	Luxembourg City, Luxembourg
20:30 CEST (UTC+1)		Report	André 31'; Nani 88'	Stadium: Stade Josy Barthel; Attendance: 8,031; Referee: Tony Chapron (France)

=== 2016 ===
25 March 2016 Friendly	Portugal	0–1	Bulgaria	Leiria, Portugal
20:45 WET (UTC±0)		Report	Marcelinho 19'	Stadium: Estádio Dr. Magalhães Pessoa; Attendance: 19,355; Referee: Carlos Clos Gómez (Spain)

29 March 2016 Friendly	Portugal	2–1	Belgium	Leiria, Portugal
19:45 WEST (UTC+1)	Nani 20'; Ronaldo 40'	Report	Lukaku 62'	Stadium: Estádio Dr. Magalhães Pessoa; Attendance: 21,157; Referee: Stephan Klossner (Switzerland)

29 May 2016 Friendly	Portugal	3–0	Norway	Porto, Portugal
20:45 WEST (UTC+1)	Quaresma 13'; Guerreiro 65'; Eder 70'	Report		Stadium: Estádio do Dragão; Attendance: 34,275; Referee: Padraig Sutton (Ireland)

2 June 2016 Friendly	England	1–0	Portugal	London, England
19:45 BST (UTC+1)	Smalling 86'	Report		Stadium: Wembley Stadium; Attendance: 82,503; Referee: Marco Guida (Italy)

8 June 2016 Friendly	Portugal	7–0	Estonia	Lisbon, Portugal
19:45 WEST (UTC+1)	Ronaldo 36', 45'; Quaresma 39', 77'; Danilo 55'; Mets 61' (o.g.); Eder 80'	Report		Stadium: Estádio da Luz; Attendance: 52,536; Referee: Bart Vertenten (Belgium)

14 June 2016 2016 EURO GS	Portugal	1–1	Iceland	Saint-Étienne, France
21:00 CEST (UTC+2)	Nani 31'	Report	B. Bjarnason 50'	Stadium: Stade Geoffroy-Guichard; Attendance: 38,742; Referee: Cüneyt Çakır (Turkey)

18 June 2016 2016 EURO GS	Portugal	0–0	Austria	Paris, France
21:00 CEST (UTC+2)		Report		Stadium: Parc des Princes; Attendance: 44,291; Referee: Nicola Rizzoli (Italy)

22 June 2016 2016 EURO GS	Hungary	3–3	Portugal	Décines-Charpieu, France
18:00 CEST (UTC+2)	Gera 19'; Dzsudzsák 47', 55'	Report	Nani 42'; Ronaldo 50', 62'	Stadium: Parc Olympique Lyonnais; Attendance: 55,514; Referee: Martin Atkinson (England)

25 June 2016 2016 EURO R16	Croatia	0–1 (a.e.t.)	Portugal	Lens, France
21:00 CEST (UTC+2)		Report	Quaresma 117'	Stadium: Stade Bollaert-Delelis; Attendance: 33,523; Referee: Carlos Velasco Carballo (Spain)

30 June 2016 2016 EURO QF	Portugal	1–1 (a.e.t.) (5–3 p)	Poland	Marseille, France
21:00 CEST (UTC+2)	Sanches 33'	Report	Lewandowski 2'	Stadium: Stade Vélodrome; Attendance: 62,940; Referee: Felix Brych (Germany)
	Penalties
	Ronaldo (penalty scored); Sanches (penalty scored); Moutinho (penalty scored); Nani (penalty scored); Quaresma (penalty scored)		(penalty scored) Lewandowski; (penalty scored) Milik; (penalty scored) Glik; (penalty missed) Błaszczykowski

6 July 2016 2016 EURO SF	Portugal	2–0	Wales	Décines-Charpieu, France
21:00 CEST (UTC+2)	Ronaldo 50'; Nani 53'	Report		Stadium: Parc Olympique Lyonnais; Attendance: 55,679; Referee: Jonas Eriksson (Sweden)

10 July 2016 2016 EURO F	Portugal	1–0 (a.e.t.)	France	Saint-Denis, France
21:00 CEST (UTC+2)	Eder 109'	Report		Stadium: Stade de France; Attendance: 75,868; Referee: Mark Clattenburg (England)

1 September 2016 Friendly	Portugal	5–0	Gibraltar	Porto, Portugal
19:45 WEST (UTC+1)	Nani 27', 55'; Cancelo 73'; B. Silva 76'; Pepe 79'	Report		Stadium: Estádio do Bessa; Attendance: 22,238; Referee: Erez Papir (Israel)

6 September 2016 2018 FWC Q	Switzerland	2–0	Portugal	Basel, Switzerland
20:45 CEST (UTC+2)	Embolo 24'; Mehmedi 30'	Report		Stadium: St. Jakob-Park; Attendance: 36,000; Referee: Antonio Mateu Lahoz (Spain)

7 October 2016 2018 FWC Q	Portugal	6–0	Andorra	Aveiro, Portugal
19:45 WEST (UTC+1)	Ronaldo 2', 4', 47', 68'; Cancelo 44'; A. Silva 86'	Report		Stadium: Estádio Municipal de Aveiro; Attendance: 25,120; Referee: Oliver Drachta (Austria)

10 October 2016 2018 FWC Q	Faroe Islands	0–6	Portugal	Tórshavn, Faroe Islands
19:45 WEST (UTC+1)		Report	A. Silva 12', 22', 37'; Ronaldo 65'; Moutinho 90+1'; Cancelo 90+3'	Stadium: Tórsvøllur; Attendance: 4,780; Referee: Gediminas Mažeika (Lithuania)

13 November 2016 2018 FWC Q	Portugal	4–1	Latvia	Faro/Loulé, Portugal
19:45 WET (UTC±0)	Ronaldo 28' (pen.), 85'; Carvalho 70'; Alves 90+2'	Report	Zjuzins 67'	Stadium: Estádio Algarve; Attendance: 20,744; Referee: Bobby Madden (Scotland)

=== 2017 ===
25 March 2017 2018 FWC Q	Portugal	3–0	Hungary	Lisbon, Portugal
19:45 WET (UTC±0)	A. Silva 32'; Ronaldo 36', 65'	Report		Stadium: Estádio da Luz; Attendance: 57,817; Referee: Szymon Marciniak (Poland)

28 March 2017 Friendly	Portugal	2–3	Sweden	Funchal, Portugal
19:45 WEST (UTC+1)	Ronaldo 18'; Granqvist 34' (o.g.)	Report	Claesson 57', 76'; Cancelo 90+3' (o.g.)	Stadium: Estádio do Marítimo; Attendance: 10,415; Referee: Clément Turpin (France)

3 June 2017 Friendly	Portugal	4–0	Cyprus	Estoril, Portugal
16:00 WEST (UTC+1)	Moutinho 3', 42'; Pizzi 63'; A. Silva 70'	Report		Stadium: Estádio António Coimbra da Mota; Attendance: 5,128; Referee: Davide Massa (Italy)

9 June 2017 2018 FWC Q	Latvia	0–3	Portugal	Riga, Latvia
21:45 EEST (UTC+3)		Report	Ronaldo 41', 63'; A. Silva 67'	Stadium: Skonto Stadium; Attendance: 8,087; Referee: István Kovács (Romania)

18 June 2017 2017 FCC GS	Portugal	2–2	Mexico	Kazan, Russia
18:00 MSK (UTC+3)	Quaresma 34'; Cédric 86'	Report	Hernández 42'; Moreno 90+1'	Stadium: Kazan Arena; Attendance: 34,372; Referee: Néstor Pitana (Argentina)

21 June 2017 2017 FCC GS	Russia	0–1	Portugal	Moscow, Russia
18:00 MSK (UTC+3)		Report	Ronaldo 8'	Stadium: Otkrytiye Arena; Attendance: 42,759; Referee: Gianluca Rocchi (Italy)

24 June 2017 2017 FCC GS	New Zealand	0–4	Portugal	Saint Petersburg, Russia
18:00 MSK (UTC+3)		Report	Ronaldo 33'; B. Silva 37'; A. Silva 80'; Nani 90+1'	Stadium: Krestovsky Stadium; Attendance: 56,290; Referee: Mark Geiger (United States)

28 June 2017 2017 FCC SF	Portugal	0–0 (a.e.t.) (0–3 p)	Chile	Kazan, Russia
21:00 MSK (UTC+3)		Report		Stadium: Kazan Arena; Attendance: 40,855; Referee: Alireza Faghani (Iran)
	Penalties
	Quaresma (penalty missed); Moutinho (penalty missed); Nani (penalty missed)		(penalty scored) Vidal; (penalty scored) Aránguiz; (penalty scored) Sánchez

2 July 2017 2017 FCC 3rd	Portugal	2–1 (a.e.t.)	Mexico	Moscow, Russia
15:00 MSK (UTC+3)	Pepe 90+1'; Adrien 104' (pen.)	Report	Neto 54' (o.g.)	Stadium: Otkrytiye Arena; Attendance: 42,659; Referee: Fahad Al-Mirdasi (Saudi Arabia)

31 August 2017 2018 FWC Q	Portugal	5–1	Faroe Islands	Porto, Portugal
19:45 WEST (UTC+1)	Ronaldo 3', 28' (pen.), 65'; Carvalho 58'; Oliveira 85'	Report	Baldvinsson 38'	Stadium: Estádio do Bessa; Attendance: 26,514; Referee: Srđan Jovanović (Serbia)

3 September 2017 2018 FWC Q	Hungary	0–1	Portugal	Budapest, Hungary
20:45 CEST (UTC+2)		Report	A. Silva 48'	Stadium: Groupama Arena; Attendance: 21,800; Referee: Danny Makkelie (Netherlands)

7 October 2017 2018 FWC Q	Andorra	0–2	Portugal	Andorra la Vella, Andorra
20:45 CEST (UTC+2)		Report	Ronaldo 63'; A. Silva 86'	Stadium: Estadi Nacional; Attendance: 3,193; Referee: Miroslav Zelinka (Czech Republic)

10 October 2017 2018 FWC Q	Portugal	2–0	Switzerland	Lisbon, Portugal
19:45 WEST (UTC+1)	Djourou 41' (o.g.); A. Silva 57'	Report		Stadium: Estádio da Luz; Attendance: 61,566; Referee: Cüneyt Çakir (Turkey)

10 November 2017 Friendly	Portugal	3–0	Saudi Arabia	Viseu, Portugal
20:45 WET (UTC±0)	M. Fernandes 32'; Guedes 52'; João Mário 90'	Report		Stadium: Estádio do Fontelo; Attendance: 6,800; Referee: Sebastian Colțescu (Romania)

14 November 2017 Friendly	Portugal	1–1	United States	Leiria, Portugal
20:45 WET (UTC±0)	Antunes 31'	Report	McKennie 21'	Stadium: Estádio Dr. Magalhães Pessoa; Attendance: 19,017; Referee: Anthony Taylor (England)

=== 2018 ===
23 March 2018 Friendly	Portugal	2–1	Egypt	Zürich, Switzerland
20:45 CET (UTC+1)	Ronaldo 90+2', 90+4'	Report	Salah 56'	Stadium: Letzigrund; Attendance: 19,869; Referee: Paolo Mazzoleni (Italy)

26 March 2018 Friendly	Portugal	0–3	Netherlands	Geneva, Switzerland
20:30 CEST (UTC+2)		Report	Depay 11'; Babel 32'; van Dijk 45+2'	Stadium: Stade de Genève; Attendance: 20,000; Referee: Ruddy Buquet (France)

28 May 2018 Friendly	Portugal	2–2	Tunisia	Braga, Portugal
19:45 WEST (UTC+1)	A. Silva 22'; João Mário 34'	Report	Badri 39'; Ben Youssef 64'	Stadium: Estádio Municipal; Attendance: 17,220; Referee: Luca Banti (Italy)

2 June 2018 Friendly	Belgium	0–0	Portugal	Brussels, Belgium
20:45 CEST (UTC+2)		Report		Stadium: King Baudouin Stadium; Attendance: 35,000; Referee: Viktor Kassai (Hungary)

7 June 2018 Friendly	Portugal	3–0	Algeria	Lisbon, Portugal
20:15 WEST (UTC+1)	Guedes 17', 55'; B. Fernandes 37'	Report		Stadium: Estádio da Luz; Attendance: 53,014; Referee: Craig Pawson (England)

15 June 2018 2018 FWC GS	Portugal	3–3	Spain	Sochi, Russia
21:00 MSK (UTC+3)	Ronaldo 4' (pen.), 44', 88'	Report	Costa 24', 55'; Nacho 58'	Stadium: Fisht Olympic Stadium; Attendance: 43,866; Referee: Gianluca Rocchi (Italy)

20 June 2018 2018 FWC GS	Portugal	1–0	Morocco	Moscow, Russia
15:00 MSK (UTC+3)	Ronaldo 4'	Report		Stadium: Luzhniki Stadium; Attendance: 78,011; Referee: Mark Geiger (United States)

25 June 2018 2018 FWC GS	Iran	1–1	Portugal	Saransk, Russia
21:00 MSK (UTC+3)	Ansarifard 90+3' (pen.)	Report	Quaresma 45'	Stadium: Mordovia Arena; Attendance: 41,685; Referee: Enrique Cáceres (Paraguay)

30 June 2018 2018 FWC R16	Uruguay	2–1	Portugal	Sochi, Russia
21:00 MSK (UTC+3)	Cavani 7', 62'	Report	Pepe 55'	Stadium: Fisht Olympic Stadium; Attendance: 44,287; Referee: César Arturo Ramos (Mexico)

6 September 2018 Friendly	Portugal	1–1	Croatia	Loulé, Portugal
19:45 WEST (UTC+1)	Pepe 32'	Report	Perišić 18'	Stadium: Estádio do Algarve; Attendance: 26,356; Referee: Xavier Estrada Fernández (Spain)

10 September 2018 2018-19 UEFA NL	Portugal	1–0	Italy	Lisbon, Portugal
19:45 WEST (UTC+1)	A. Silva 48'	Report		Stadium: Estádio da Luz; Attendance: 52,635; Referee: Willie Collum (Scotland)

11 October 2018 2018-19 UEFA NL	Poland	2–3	Portugal	Chorzów, Poland
20:45 CEST (UTC+2)	Piątek 18'; Błaszczykowski 77'	Report	A. Silva 32'; Glik 43' (o.g.); B. Silva 52'	Stadium: Stadion Śląski; Attendance: 48,783; Referee: Carlos del Cerro Grande (Spain)

14 October 2018 Friendly	Scotland	1–3	Portugal	Glasgow, Scotland
17:00 BST (UTC+1)	Naismith 90+3'	Report	Costa 43'; Eder 74'; Bruma 84'	Stadium: Hampden Park; Attendance: 19,684; Referee: Ruddy Buquet (France)

17 November 2018 2018-19 UEFA NL	Italy	0–0	Portugal	Milan, Italy
20:45 CET (UTC+1)		Report		Stadium: San Siro; Attendance: 73,000; Referee: Danny Makkelie (Netherlands)

20 November 2018 2018-19 UEFA NL	Portugal	1–1	Poland	Guimarães, Portugal
19:45 WET (UTC±0)	A. Silva 34'	Report	Milik 66' (pen.)	Stadium: Estádio D. Afonso Henriques; Attendance: 29,917; Referee: Sergei Karasev (Russia)

Key: GS, Group stage; R16, round of 16; QF, quarter-finals; SF, semi-finals; 3rd, third-place match; FWC, FIFA World Cup; FWC Q, FIFA World Cup qualification; UEFA NL, UEFA Nations League; FCC, FIFA Confederations Cup

=== 2019 ===
22 March 2019 2020 EURO Q	Portugal	0–0	Ukraine	Lisbon, Portugal
20:45 (19:45 UTC+0)		Report		Stadium: Estádio da Luz; Attendance: 58,355; Referee: Clément Turpin (France)

25 March 2019 2020 EURO Q	Portugal	1–1	Serbia	Lisbon, Portugal
20:45 (19:45 UTC+0)	Danilo 42'	Report	Tadić 7' (pen.)	Stadium: Estádio da Luz; Attendance: 50,342; Referee: Szymon Marciniak (Poland)

5 June 2019 2019 UEFA NL SF	Portugal	3–1	Switzerland	Porto, Portugal
20:45 (19:45 UTC+1)	Ronaldo 25', 88', 90'	Report	Rodríguez 57' (pen.)	Stadium: Estádio do Dragão; Attendance: 42,415; Referee: Felix Brych (Germany)

9 June 2019 2019 UEFA NL F	Portugal	1–0	Netherlands	Porto, Portugal
19:45	Guedes 60'	Report		Stadium: Estádio do Dragão; Attendance: 43,199; Referee: Alberto Undiano Mallenco (Spain)

7 September 2019 2020 EURO Q	Serbia	2–4	Portugal	Belgrade, Serbia
20:45	Milenković 68'; A. Mitrović 85'	Report	Carvalho 42'; Guedes 58'; Ronaldo 80'; B. Silva 86'	Stadium: Stadion Rajko Mitić; Attendance: 39,839; Referee: Cüneyt Çakır (Turkey)

10 September 2019 2020 EURO Q	Lithuania	1–5	Portugal	Vilnius, Lithuania
20:45 (21:45 UTC+3)	Andriuškevičius 28'	Report	Ronaldo 7' (pen.), 62', 65', 76'; Carvalho 90+2'	Stadium: LFF Stadium; Attendance: 5,067; Referee: Bas Nijhuis (Netherlands)

11 October 2019 2020 EURO Q	Portugal	3–0	Luxembourg	Lisbon, Portugal
20:45 (19:45 UTC+1)	B. Silva 16'; Ronaldo 65'; Guedes 89'	Report		Stadium: Estádio José Alvalade; Attendance: 47,305; Referee: Daniel Stefański (Poland)

14 October 2019 2020 EURO Q	Ukraine	2–1	Portugal	Kyiv, Ukraine
20:45 (21:45 UTC+3)	Yaremchuk 6'; Yarmolenko 27'	Report	Ronaldo 72' (pen.)	Stadium: NSC Olimpiyskiy Stadium; Attendance: 65,883; Referee: Anthony Taylor (England)

14 November 2019 2020 EURO Q	Portugal	6–0	Lithuania	Faro/Loulé, Portugal
20:45 (19:45 UTC+0)	Ronaldo 7' (pen.), 22', 65'; Pizzi 52'; Paciência 56'; B. Silva 63'	Report		Stadium: Estádio Algarve; Attendance: 18,534; Referee: Ruddy Buquet (France)

17 November 2019 2020 EURO Q	Luxembourg	0–2	Portugal	Luxembourg City, Luxembourg
15:00		Report	Fernandes 39'; Ronaldo 86'	Stadium: Stade Josy Barthel; Attendance: 8,000; Referee: Jesús Gil Manzano (Spain)

Key: SF, Semi-finals; F, Final; EURO, UEFA European Championship; 2020 EURO Q, UEFA Euro 2020 qualification; UEFA NL, UEFA Nations League
