= 2002 FIFA World Cup qualification – UEFA Group 2 =

Football tournament qualification stage

The 2002 FIFA World Cup qualification UEFA Group 2 was a UEFA qualifying group for the 2002 FIFA World Cup. The group comprised Andorra, Cyprus, Estonia, the Netherlands, Portugal and the Republic of Ireland.

The group was won by Portugal, who qualified for the 2002 FIFA World Cup. The runners-up Republic of Ireland entered the UEFA–AFC play-off as the group's play-off berth was randomly drawn by FIFA for the intercontinental play-off against an AFC team not one from its own confederation. Portugal, Ireland, and the Netherlands were clearly the top sides in the group, each handing out six beatings to the three other minnows. Between the top three, four of the matches were drawn, but the Netherlands lost one match each to Portugal and Ireland and had to settle for third place. In the end, Portugal only topped the group ahead of Ireland by virtue of superior goal difference.

== Standings ==
Pos	Team	Pld	W	D	L	GF	GA	GD	Pts	Qualification	Portugal national football team	Republic of Ireland national football team	Netherlands national football team	Estonia national football team	Cyprus national football team	Andorra national football team
1	Portugal	10	7	3	0	33	7	+26	24	Qualification to 2002 FIFA World Cup	—	1–1	2–2	5–0	6–0	3–0
2	Republic of Ireland	10	7	3	0	23	5	+18	24	Advance to inter-confederation play-offs	1–1	—	1–0	2–0	4–0	3–1
3	Netherlands	10	6	2	2	30	9	+21	20		0–2	2–2	—	5–0	4–0	4–0
4	Estonia	10	2	2	6	10	26	−16	8		1–3	0–2	2–4	—	2–2	1–0
5	Cyprus	10	2	2	6	13	31	−18	8		1–3	0–4	0–4	2–2	—	5–0
6	Andorra	10	0	0	10	5	36	−31	0		1–7	0–3	0–5	1–2	2–3	—

== Matches ==
16 August 2000
18:00 UTC+3

Estonia	1–0	Andorra
Reim 66' (pen.)	Report

Kadriorg Stadium, Tallinn
Attendance: 1,600
Referee: Zoran Arsić (FR Yugoslavia)

2 September 2000
17:30 UTC+2

Andorra	2–3	Cyprus
González 45'; I. Lima 52'	Report	Konstantinou 25' (pen.), 90'; Agathokleous 77'

Estadi Comunal, Andorra la Vella
Attendance: 600
Referee: Ihor Yarmenchuk (Ukraine)
2 September 2000
20:30 UTC+2

Netherlands	2–2	Republic of Ireland
Talan 71'; Van Bronckhorst 84'	Report	Robbie Keane 21'; McAteer 65'

Amsterdam Arena, Amsterdam
Attendance: 45,000
Referee: Ľuboš Micheľ (Slovakia)
3 September 2000
17:00 UTC+3

Estonia	1–3	Portugal
Oper 83'	Report	Rui Costa 15'; Figo 49'; Sá Pinto 57'

Kadriorg Stadium, Tallinn
Attendance: 4,700
Referee: Charles Agius (Malta)

7 October 2000
16:00 UTC+2

Andorra	1–2	Estonia
Ruiz 90+1' (pen.)	Report	Reim 55'; Oper 65'

Estadi Comunal, Andorra la Vella
Attendance: 650
Referee: Dani Koren (Israel)
7 October 2000
20:30 UTC+3

Cyprus	0–4	Netherlands
	Report	Seedorf 69', 78'; Overmars 82'; Kluivert 90'

GSP Stadium, Nicosia
Attendance: 10,250
Referee: Graziano Cesari (Italy)
7 October 2000
21:00 UTC+1

Portugal	1–1	Republic of Ireland
Conceição 57'	Report	Holland 73'

Estádio da Luz, Lisbon
Attendance: 43,500
Referee: Atanas Uzunov (Bulgaria)

11 October 2000
19:30 UTC+1

Republic of Ireland	2–0	Estonia
Kinsella 25'; Dunne 51'	Report

Lansdowne Road, Dublin
Attendance: 34,962
Referee: Terje Hauge (Norway)
11 October 2000
20:30 UTC+2

Netherlands	0–2	Portugal
	Report	Conceição 11'; Pauleta 44'

De Kuip, Rotterdam
Attendance: 44,620
Referee: Graham Poll (England)

15 November 2000
19:00 UTC+2

Cyprus	5–0	Andorra
Okkas 10', 18'; Agathokleous 43'; Christodoulou 73'; Špoljarić 90' (pen.)	Report

Tsirion Stadium, Limassol
Attendance: 1,193
Referee: Sten Johanzon (Sweden)

28 February 2001
21:00 UTC

Portugal	3–0	Andorra
Figo 1', 49'; Pauleta 36'	Report

Estádio dos Barreiros, Funchal
Attendance: 9,000
Referee: Paul Allaerts (Belgium)

24 March 2001
20:00 UTC+2

Cyprus	0–4	Republic of Ireland
	Report	Roy Keane 32', 88'; Harte 42' (pen.); G. Kelly 80'

GSP Stadium, Nicosia
Attendance: 8,854
Referee: Frank De Bleeckere (Belgium)
24 March 2001
20:30 UTC+1

Andorra	0–5	Netherlands
	Report	Kluivert 9'; Hasselbaink 36'; Van Hooijdonk 61', 70'; Van Bommel 84'

Mini Estadi, Barcelona
Attendance: 3,823
Referee: Edo Trivković (Croatia)

28 March 2001
18:30 UTC+2

Andorra	0–3	Republic of Ireland
	Report	Harte 33' (pen.); Kilbane 76'; Holland 80'

Mini Estadi, Barcelona
Attendance: 5,000
Referee: Ihor Ishchenko (Ukraine)
28 March 2001
19:00 UTC+3

Cyprus	2–2	Estonia
Konstantinou 47'; Okkas 64'	Report	Kristal 76'; Piiroja 78'

Tsirion Stadium, Limassol
Attendance: 3,000
Referee: Tomasz Mikulski (Poland)
28 March 2001
21:00 UTC+1

Portugal	2–2	Netherlands
Pauleta 83'; Figo 90+1' (pen.)	Report	Hasselbaink 18' (pen.); Kluivert 48'

Estádio das Antas, Porto
Attendance: 42,164
Referee: Urs Meier (Switzerland)

25 April 2001
19:00 UTC+1

Republic of Ireland	3–1	Andorra
Kilbane 33'; Kinsella 36'; Breen 73'	Report	Lima 31'

Lansdowne Road, Dublin
Attendance: 35,000
Referee: Kristinn Jakobsson (Iceland)
25 April 2001
20:30 UTC+2

Netherlands	4–0	Cyprus
Hasselbaink 29'; Overmars 35'; Kluivert 44'; Van Nistelrooy 81'	Report

Philips Stadion, Eindhoven
Attendance: 31,000
Referee: Yuri Baskakov (Russia)

2 June 2001
15:00 UTC+1

Republic of Ireland	1–1	Portugal
Roy Keane 68'	Report	Figo 78'

Lansdowne Road, Dublin
Attendance: 35,000
Referee: Knud Erik Fisker (Denmark)
2 June 2001
15:00 UTC+3

Estonia	2–4	Netherlands
Oper 65'; Zelinski 76'	Report	Piiroja 68' (o.g.); Van Nistelrooy 83', 90'; Kluivert 90'

Lilleküla Stadium, Tallinn
Attendance: 9,323
Referee: Ceri Richards (Wales)

6 June 2001
18:00 UTC+3

Estonia	0–2	Republic of Ireland
	Report	Dunne 8'; Holland 38'

Lilleküla Stadium, Tallinn
Attendance: 8,000
Referee: Marian Salomir (Romania)
6 June 2001
21:00 UTC+1

Portugal	6–0	Cyprus
Pauleta 36', 70'; Barbosa 55', 60'; João Pinto 76', 81'	Report

Estádio José Alvalade, Lisbon
Attendance: 34,500
Referee: Stefano Farina (Italy)

15 August 2001
21:00 UTC+3

Estonia	2–2	Cyprus
Zelinski 51'; Novikov 86'	Report	Konstantinou 39', 69'

Lilleküla Stadium, Tallinn
Attendance: 5,000
Referee: Oleg Chikun (Belarus)

1 September 2001
15:00 UTC+1

Republic of Ireland	1–0	Netherlands
McAteer 68'	Report

Lansdowne Road, Dublin
Attendance: 35,400
Referee: Hellmut Krug (Germany)
1 September 2001
22:00 UTC+2

Andorra	1–7	Portugal
Jonas 42'	Report	Nuno Gomes 36', 40', 45', 90'; Pauleta 39'; Rui Jorge 45'; Conceição 58'

Camp d'Esports, Lleida
Attendance: 4,876
Referee: Terje Hauge (Norway)

5 September 2001
20:30 UTC+2

Netherlands	5–0	Estonia
Zenden 16'; Van Bommel 26', 39'; Cocu 32'; Van Nistelrooy 43'	Report

Philips Stadion, Eindhoven
Attendance: 28,500
Referee: Kyros Vassaras (Greece)
5 September 2001
20:30 UTC+3

Cyprus	1–3	Portugal
Konstantinou 25'	Report	Nuno Gomes 48'; Pauleta 64'; Conceição 71'

Antonis Papadopoulos Stadium, Larnaca
Attendance: 2,878
Referee: Karl-Erik Nilsson (Sweden)

6 October 2001
18:00 UTC+1

Portugal	5–0	Estonia
João Pinto 30'; Nuno Gomes 50', 65'; Pauleta 59'; Figo 80'	Report

Estádio da Luz, Lisbon
Attendance: 77,000
Referee: Hartmut Strampe (Germany)
6 October 2001
18:00 UTC+1

Republic of Ireland	4–0	Cyprus
Harte 3'; Quinn 11'; Connolly 63'; Roy Keane 67'	Report

Lansdowne Road, Dublin
Attendance: 35,000
Referee: Juan Ansuátegui Roca (Spain)
6 October 2001
20:30 UTC+2

Netherlands	4–0	Andorra
Van Hooijdonk 3' (pen.); Seedorf 45'; Van Nistelrooy 53', 89'	Report

GelreDome, Arnhem
Attendance: 20,000
Referee: Orhan Erdemir (Turkey)

== Goalscorers ==
There were 114 goals scored in 30 matches, for an average of 3.8 goals per match.

8 goals

- (Portugal) Pauleta

7 goals

- (Portugal) Nuno Gomes

6 goals

- (Cyprus) Michalis Konstantinou
- (Netherlands) Ruud Van Nistelrooy
- (Portugal) Luís Figo

5 goals

- (Netherlands) Patrick Kluivert

4 goals

- (Republic of Ireland) Roy Keane
- (Portugal) Sérgio Conceição

3 goals

- (Cyprus) Ioannis Okkas
- (Estonia) Andres Oper
- (Republic of Ireland) Ian Harte
- (Republic of Ireland) Matt Holland
- (Netherlands) Jimmy Floyd Hasselbaink
- (Netherlands) Clarence Seedorf
- (Netherlands) Mark Van Bommel
- (Netherlands) Pierre Van Hooijdonk
- (Portugal) João Vieira Pinto

2 goals

- (Andorra) Ildefons Lima
- (Cyprus) Marios Agathokleous
- (Estonia) Martin Reim
- (Estonia) Indrek Zelinski
- (Republic of Ireland) Richard Dunne
- (Republic of Ireland) Kevin Kilbane
- (Republic of Ireland) Mark Kinsella
- (Republic of Ireland) Jason McAteer
- (Netherlands) Marc Overmars
- (Portugal) Pedro Barbosa

1 goal

- (Andorra) Emiliano González Arqués
- (Andorra) Roberto Jonas
- (Andorra) Justo Ruiz
- (Cyprus) Marios Christodoulou
- (Cyprus) Milenko Špoljarić
- (Estonia) Marko Kristal
- (Estonia) Jevgeni Novikov
- (Estonia) Raio Piiroja
- (Republic of Ireland) Gary Breen
- (Republic of Ireland) David Connolly
- (Republic of Ireland) Robbie Keane
- (Republic of Ireland) Gary Kelly
- (Republic of Ireland) Niall Quinn
- (Netherlands) Phillip Cocu
- (Netherlands) Jeffrey Talan
- (Netherlands) Giovanni van Bronckhorst
- (Netherlands) Boudewijn Zenden
- (Portugal) Rui Jorge
- (Portugal) Manuel Rui Costa
- (Portugal) Ricardo Sá Pinto

1 own goal

- (Estonia) Raio Piiroja (against the Netherlands)
