= Emiliano González (footballer) =

Association football player

Personal information
- Full name: Emiliano González Arqués
- Date of birth: 20 September 1969 (age 57)
- Place of birth: Santander, Spain
- Position: Striker

Youth career
- Racing de Santander

Senior career*
| Years | Team | Apps | (Gls) |
| | Racing de Santander B | ? | (?) |
| 19??–1991 | Escobedo | ? | (?) |
| 1991–2004 | FC Andorra | ? | (?) |

International career
| 1998–2003 | Andorra | 37 | (3) |
- * Club domestic league appearances and goals

Emiliano González Arqués (born 20 September 1969) is a retired footballer who played as a striker. Born and raised in Spain, he moved to Andorra at 21, when he was signed by FC Andorra, and ultimately became a naturalised citizen of Andorra and represented the Andorra national team. He earned 37 international caps between 1998 and 2003.

== Career statistics ==
=== International ===
Appearances and goals by national team and year
| National team | Year | Apps | Goals |
|---|---|---|---|
| Andorra | 1998 | 2 | 0 |
| Andorra | 1999 | 9 | 1 |
| Andorra | 2000 | 8 | 1 |
| Andorra | 2001 | 6 | 0 |
| Andorra | 2002 | 6 | 1 |
| Andorra | 2003 | 6 | 0 |
| Total | | 37 | 3 |

Scores and results list Andorra's goal tally first, score column indicates score after each González goal.

List of international goals scored by Emiliano González
| No. | Date | Venue | Opponent | Score | Result | Competition | Ref. |
|---|---|---|---|---|---|---|---|
| 1 | 31 March 1999 | Lokomotiv Stadium, Moscow, Russia | Russia | 1–5 | 1–6 | UEFA Euro 2000 qualifying | |
| 2 | 2 September 2000 | Estadi Comunal, Andorra la Vella, Andorra | Cyprus | 1–1 | 2–3 | 2002 FIFA World Cup qualification | |
| 3 | 17 April 2002 | Estadi Comunal, Andorra la Vella, Andorra | Albania | 1–0 | 2–0 | Friendly | |
