= Roberto Jonas =

Andorran footballer

Personal information
- Date of birth: 7 June 1967 (age 59)
- Place of birth: Andorra
- Position: Defender

International career
Years	Team	Apps	(Gls)
1999–2005	Andorra	30	(1)

Roberto Jonas Alonso (born 7 June 1967) is an Andorran footballer. He has played for the Andorra national team.

== National team statistics ==
Andorra national team
Year	Apps	Goals
1999	4	0
2000	5	0
2001	6	1
2002	6	0
2003	5	0
2004	4	0
2005	1	0
Total	30	1

=== International goal ===
Scores and results list Andorra's goal tally first.

Goal	Date	Venue	Opponent	Score	Result	Competition
1.	1 September 2001	Camp d'Esports, Lleida, Spain	Portugal	1–3	1–7	2002 World Cup qualifier
