= 2017–18 PFC Levski Sofia season =

Levski Sofia
2017–18 season
- Chairman: Spas Rusev
- Manager: Nikolay Mitov (until 2 August 2017); Delio Rossi (since 4 August 2017)
- Stadium: Vivacom Arena - Georgi Asparuhov
- First League: 3rd
- Bulgarian Cup: Runners-up
- UEFA Europa League: Second qualifying round
- Top goalscorer: League: David Jablonský (9); All: Sergiu Buș (12)
- Highest home attendance: 14,000 v. Ludogorets (6 September 2017)
- Lowest home attendance: 490 v. Pirin Blagoevgrad (2 December 2017)
- Average home league attendance: 5,335
- Biggest win: 4–0 v. Slavia Sofia (H) v. Dunav Ruse (A) v. Beroe (A)
- Biggest defeat: 0–2 v. Vereya (A) v. Ludogorets (A)
Home colours	Away colours	Third colours

The 2017–18 season was Levski Sofia's 97th season in the First League. This article shows player statistics and all matches (official and friendly) that the club has played during the season.

== Transfers ==
=== In ===
No.	Pos.	Nat.	Name	Age	EU	Moving from	Type	Transfer window	Ends	Transfer fee	Source
10	FW	(Democratic Republic of the Congo)	Junior Mapuku	27	EU	(Bulgaria) Beroe	Free Transfer	Summer	2019	Free	dnes.bg
9	FW	(Romania)	Sergiu Buș	24	EU	(Romania) Astra Giurgiu	Free Transfer	Summer	2020	Free	blitz.bg
24	GK	(Bulgaria)	Aleksandar Lyubenov	22	EU	(Bulgaria) Lokomotiv Plovdiv	Free Transfer	Summer	2020	Free	Levski.bg
25	MF	(Bulgaria)	Georgi Angelov	26	EU	(Bulgaria) Vereya	Free Transfer	Summer	2020	Free	Levski.bg
8	MF	(Bulgaria)	Antonio Vutov	21	EU	(Italy) Udinese	Loan	Summer	2018		Levski.bg
4	DF	(Bulgaria)	Ivan Goranov	25	EU	(Bulgaria) Lokomotiv Plovdiv	Free Transfer	Summer	2020	Free	Levski.bg
19	DF	(Serbia)	Miloš Cvetković	27	Non-EU	(Serbia) Napredak Kruševac	Free Transfer	Summer	2019	Free	Levski.bg
71	MF	(Bulgaria)	Vasil Panayotov	26	EU	(Poland) Stal Mielec	Free Transfer	Summer	2018	Free	Levski.bg
30	MF	(Romania)	Neluț Roșu	23	EU	(Romania) Viitorul	Transfer	Summer	2020	100 000 €	Levski.bg
13	MF	(Spain)	Jordi Gómez	32	EU	(Spain) Rayo Vallecano	Free Transfer	Summer	2019	Free	Levski.bg
32	MF	(France)	Gabriel Obertan	28	EU	(England) Wigan Athletic	Free Transfer	Summer	2019	Free	Levski.bg
11	MF	(France)	Anthony Belmonte	21	EU	(France) Dijon	Free Transfer	Summer	2020	Free	Levski.bg
5	DF	(Iceland)	Hólmar Örn Eyjólfsson	27	EU	(Israel) Maccabi Haifa	Loan	Summer	2021	Free	Levski.bg
26	MF	(Cape Verde)	Jerson Cabral	26	EU	(France) Bastia	Free Transfer	Summer	2019	Free	Levski.bg
3	DF	(Tunisia)	Aymen Belaïd	28	EU	(England) Rotherham United	Free Transfer	Winter	2019	Free	Levski.bg
29	FW	(Bulgaria)	Stanislav Kostov	26	EU	(Bulgaria) Pirin Blagoevgrad	Free Transfer	Winter	2020	Free	Levski.bg
7	MF	(Brazil)	Paulinho	24	Non-EU	(Ukraine) Zorya Luhansk	Free Transfer	Winter	2021	Free	Levski.bg
10	FW	(Brazil)	Rivaldinho	22	Non-EU	(Romania) Dinamo București	Free Transfer	Winter	2020	Free	Levski.bg
20	MF	(Portugal)	Filipe Nascimento	23	EU	(Romania) Dinamo București	Transfer	Winter	2020	200 000 €	Levski.bg
25	DF	(Portugal)	Afonso Figueiredo	25	EU	(France) Rennes	Loan	Winter	2018		Levski.bg
14	MF	(Senegal)	Khaly Thiam	24	Non-EU	(Hungary) MTK Budapest	Loan	Winter	2018		Levski.bg

=== Out ===
No.	Pos.	Nat.	Name	Age	EU	Moving to	Type	Transfer window	Transfer fee	Source
8	MF	(Curaçao)	Jeremy de Nooijer	25	EU	(Moldova) Sheriff Tiraspol	End of contract	Summer	Free	gol.bg
70	MF	(Bulgaria)	Georgi Kostadinov	26	EU	(Israel) Maccabi Haifa	End of contract	Summer	Free	Topsport.bg
2	DF	(Romania)	Srdjan Luchin	31	EU	(Romania) CFR Cluj	End of contract	Summer	Free	topsport.bg
20	MF	(Spain)	Añete	31	EU	(Greece) Apollon Smyrnis	End of contract	Summer	Free	
18	MF	(Bulgaria)	Anton Ognyanov	28	EU	(Bulgaria) Cherno More	Released	Summer	Free	
5	DF	(Bulgaria)	Aleksandar Aleksandrov	31	EU	(Bulgaria) Cherno More	Released	Summer	Free	Topsport.bg
25	DF	(Bulgaria)	Sasho Aleksandrov	30	EU	(Bulgaria) Etar	Released	Summer	Free	Sportal.bg
14	DF	(Bulgaria)	Veselin Minev	36	EU	(Bulgaria) Etar	Released	Summer	Free	Levski.bg
12	MF	(Bulgaria)	Bozhidar Kraev	19	EU	(Denmark) Midtjylland	Transfer	Summer	400 000 €	Gong.bg
27	MF	(France)	Mehdi Bourabia	25	EU	(Turkey) Konyaspor	Transfer	Summer	600 000 €	Levski.bg
26	FW	(France)	Amadou Soukouna	25	EU	(Bulgaria) Cherno More	Released	Summer	Free	Sportal.bg
23	DF	(Sweden)	Simon Sandberg	23	EU	(Sweden) Hammarby	Released	Winter	Free	Sportal.bg
7	FW	(Ghana)	Francis Narh	23	Non-EU	(Cyprus) Doxa Katokopias	Released	Winter	Free	Sportal.bg
17	FW	(Nigeria)	Tunde Adeniji	22	Non-EU	(Kazakhstan) Atyrau	Released	Winter	Free	Sportal.bg
14	DF	(Bulgaria)	Miki Orachev	21	EU	(Bulgaria) Septemvri Sofia	Released	Winter	Free	fcseptemvri.bg
3	DF	(Bulgaria)	Dimitar Pirgov	28	EU	(Bulgaria) Botev Plovdiv	Transfer	Winter	12 500 €	gong.bg
10	FW	(Democratic Republic of the Congo)	Junior Mapuku	28	EU	(China) Shijiazhuang Ever Bright	Transfer	Winter	500 000 €	Sportal.bg

=== Loans out ===
No.	Pos.	Nat.	Name	Age	EU	Moving to	Type	Transfer window	Transfer fee	Source
	DF	(Bulgaria)	Galin Tashev	20	EU	(Bulgaria) Lokomotiv Sofia	Loan	Summer	—	Sportal.bg
	FW	(Bulgaria)	Iliya Dimitrov	20	EU	(Bulgaria) Lokomotiv Sofia	Loan	Summer	—	Sportal.bg
	DF	(Bulgaria)	Deyan Ivanov	21	EU	(Bulgaria) Botev Vratsa	Loan	Summer	—	Football24.bg
	MF	(Bulgaria)	Georgi Yanev	19	EU	(Bulgaria) Strumska Slava	Loan	Summer	—	Blitz.bg
	MF	(Bulgaria)	Atanas Kabov	18	EU	(Bulgaria) Botev Vratsa	Loan	Summer	—	Sportal.bg
24	GK	(Bulgaria)	Aleksandar Lyubenov	22	EU	(Bulgaria) Botev Vratsa	Loan	Winter	—	Topsport.bg
75	MF	(Bulgaria)	Aleks Borimirov	19	EU	(Bulgaria) Lokomotiv Sofia	Loan	Winter	—	Blitz.bg
55	DF	(Bulgaria)	Georgi Angelov	27	EU	(Bulgaria) Vitosha Bistritsa	Loan	Winter	—	Sportal.bg

== Squad ==
Updated on 1 March 2017.

No.	Name	Nationality	Position(s)	Age	EU	Since	Ends	Signed from	Transfer Fee	Notes
Goalkeepers
12	Petar Ivanov	Bulgaria	GK	25	EU	2018		Youth system	W/S	
21	Bozhidar Mitrev	Bulgaria	GK	38	EU	2017	2018	(Moldova) Sheriff Tiraspol	Free	Originally from Youth system
89	Nikolay Krastev	Bulgaria	GK	29	EU	2017	2020	Youth system	W/S	
Defenders
3	Aymen Belaïd	Tunisia	CB/LB	37	EU	2017	2019	(England) Rotherham United	Free	Second nationality: France
4	Ivan Goranov	Bulgaria	LB	33	EU	2017	2020	(Bulgaria) Lokomotiv Plovdiv	Free	Originally from Youth system
5	Hólmar Örn Eyjólfsson	Iceland	CB	35	EU	2017	2021	(Israel) Maccabi Haifa	Loan	
19	Miloš Cvetković	Serbia	RB	36	Non-EU	2017	2019	(Serbia) Napredak Kruševac	Free	
24	Tomislav Papazov	Bulgaria	CB	24	EU	2018		Youth system	W/S	
25	Afonso Figueiredo	Portugal	LB	33	EU	2018	2018	(France) Rennes	Loan	
28	David Jablonský	Czech Republic	CB/RB/LB	34	EU	2017	2019	(Russia) Tom Tomsk	Free	
Midfielders
6	Ivaylo Naydenov	Bulgaria	CM/RB	27	EU	2016		Youth system	W/S	
8	Antonio Vutov	Bulgaria	AM	29	EU	2017	2018	(Italy) Udinese	Loan	Originally from Youth system
11	Anthony Belmonte	France	DM/CM	30	EU	2017	2020	(France) Dijon	Free	
13	Jordi Gómez	Spain	AM	40	EU	2017	2019	(Spain) Rayo Vallecano	Free	
14	Khaly Thiam	Senegal	DM	32	Non-EU	2018	2018	(Hungary) MTK Budapest	Loan	
15	Roman Procházka	Slovakia	CM/RW/RB	36	EU	2014	2018	(Slovakia) Spartak Trnava	€0.12M	
17	Martin Petkov	Bulgaria	AM/LW	25	EU	2018		Youth system	W/S	
20	Filipe Nascimento	Portugal	CM	31	EU	2018	2020	(Romania) Dinamo București	€0.20M	
30	Neluț Roșu	Romania	CM	32	EU	2017	2020	(Romania) Viitorul	€0.10M	
71	Vasil Panayotov	Bulgaria	CM	35	EU	2017	2018	(Poland) Stal Mielec	Free	Originally from Youth system
77	Iliya Yurukov	Bulgaria	CM	26	EU	2016		Youth system	W/S	
Forwards
7	Paulinho	Brazil	LW/RW	32	Non-EU	2018	2021	(Ukraine) Zorya Luhansk	Free	
9	Sergiu Buș	Romania	CF	33	EU	2017	2020	(Romania) Astra Giurgiu	Free	
10	Rivaldinho	Brazil	CF	30	EU	2018	2020	(Romania) Dinamo București	Free	Second nationality: Spain
26	Jerson Cabral	Cape Verde	RW/LW	35	EU	2017	2019	(France) Bastia	Free	Second nationality: Netherlands
29	Stanislav Kostov	Bulgaria	CF	34	EU	2018	2020	(Bulgaria) Pirin Blagoegrad	Free	
32	Gabriel Obertan	France	RW/LW	36	EU	2017	2019	(England) Wigan Athletic	Free	
99	Stanislav Ivanov	Bulgaria	CF/RW	26	EU	2016	2021	Youth system	W/S	

== Performance overview ==
Competition	First match	Last match	Starting round	Final position	Record							
Competition	First match	Last match	Starting round	Final position	Pld	W	D	L	GF	GA	GD	Win %
First League	23 July 2017	24 May 2018	Matchday 1	3rd	37	19	10	8	59	28	+31	51.35
Bulgarian Cup	19 September 2017	9 May 2018	Round of 32	Runners-up	6	4	2	0	8	2	+6	66.67
UEFA Europa League	29 June 2017	20 July 2017	First qualifying round	Second qualifying round	4	1	1	2	4	4	+0	25.00
Total					47	24	13	10	71	34	+37	51.06

Source: Fixtures

== Fixtures ==
Win Draw Loss Upcoming fixture

=== Friendlies ===
==== Summer ====
20 June 2017	Levski Sofia	0–1	Cherno More	Pravets
17:00 EET		Report	Kokonov 53'	Stadium: Pravets Sport Complex

23 June 2017	Levski Sofia (Bulgaria)	1–0	(Serbia) Radnik Surdulica	Pravets
18:30 EET	Adeniji 8'			Stadium: Pravets Sport Complex

==== Mid-season ====
9 August 2017	Levski Sofia	1–3	Slivnishki Geroy	Sofia
20:00 EET	Obertan 13'		Georgiev 34'; Popov 55'; Vachev 66'	Stadium: Vivacom Arena - Georgi Asparuhov

8 October 2017	Levski Sofia	1–0	Botev Vratsa	Sofia
17:00 EET	Belmonte 18'			Stadium: Vivacom Arena - Georgi Asparuhov

1 November 2017	Levski Sofia	7–0	Sportist Svoge	Sofia
17:30 EET	Cabral 18'; Eyjólfsson 31'; Buș 38', 45'; Adeniji 80', 86'; Kovachev 90'			Stadium: Vivacom Arena - Georgi Asparuhov

12 November 2017	Levski Sofia	3–0	Lokomotiv Sofia	Sofia
16:00 EET	Adeniji 70', 81'; Cabral 76'			Stadium: Vivacom Arena - Georgi Asparuhov

==== Winter ====
17 January 2018	Levski Sofia (Bulgaria)	0–3	(Malta) Hibernians	Ta' Qali, Malta
19:30 EET			Failla 3'; Moreira 45'; Mbong 69'	Stadium: Ta' Qali

21 January 2018	Levski Sofia (Bulgaria)	3–0	(Austria) Wolfsberger AC	Paola, Malta
17:00 EET	Vutov 65'; Mapuku 71', 75'			Stadium: Hibernians Stadium

29 January 2018	Levski Sofia (Bulgaria)	2–2	(Malta) Floriana	Ta' Qali, Malta
17:30 EET	Eyjólfsson 39'; Kostov 67'		Juninho 12', 27'	Stadium: Ta' Qali

2 February 2018	Levski Sofia (Bulgaria)	3–1	(Austria) Floridsdorfer AC	Ta' Qali, Malta
17:30 EET	Vutov 56'; Kostov 60'; Jablonský 69'		Fucik 2'	Stadium: Ta' Qali

3 February 2018	Levski Sofia (Bulgaria)	2–1	(Switzerland) St. Gallen II	Ta' Qali, Malta
16:30 EET	Vutov 26' (pen.); Kostov 43'		Valentino 53'	Stadium: Ta' Qali

5 February 2018	Levski Sofia (Bulgaria)	2–1	(Malta) Gżira United	Ta' Qali, Malta
17:30 EET	Jablonský 21'; Nascimento 52' (pen.)		Samb 37'	Stadium: Ta' Qali

10 February 2018	Levski Sofia	5–1	Slivnishki Geroy	Sofia
17:30 EET	Cabral 23'; Kostov 45'; Obertan 51'; Belaïd 69'; Buș 71'		Marinov 77'	Stadium: Vivacom Arena - Georgi Asparuhov

=== Parva Liga ===
==== Preliminary stage ====
===== League table =====
Pos	Team	Pld	W	D	L	GF	GA	GD	Pts	Qualification
1	Ludogorets Razgrad	26	21	3	2	63	13	+50	66	Qualification for the Championship round
2	CSKA Sofia	26	19	6	1	59	14	+45	63	Qualification for the Championship round
3	Levski Sofia	26	14	8	4	37	14	+23	50	Qualification for the Championship round
4	Beroe	26	12	9	5	33	24	+9	45	Qualification for the Championship round
5	Botev Plovdiv	26	11	9	6	44	29	+15	42	Qualification for the Championship round

Source: Soccerway
Rules for classification: 1) Points; 2) Head-to-head points; 3) Head-to-head goal difference; 4) Head-to-head goals scored; 5) Head-to-head away goals scored (only if two teams); 6) Goal difference; 7) Goals scored; 8) Fairplay ranking; 9) Draw.

===== Results summary =====
Overall								Home						Away					
Pld	W	D	L	GF	GA	GD	Pts	W	D	L	GF	GA	GD	W	D	L	GF	GA	GD
26	14	8	4	37	14	+23	50	9	4	0	19	3	+16	5	4	4	18	11	+7

Last updated: 4 November 2017.
Source: bulgarian-football.com

===== Results by round =====
Round	1	2	3	4	5	6	7	8	9	10	11	12	13	14	15	16	17	18	19	20	21	22	23	24	25	26
Ground	H	A	H	A	H	A	H	A	H	A	H	A	H	A	H	A	H	A	H	A	H	A	H	A	H	A
Result	D	D	W	L	W	W	W	L	W	D	W	W	D	L	W	D	W	W	W	D	W	W	D	W	D	L
Position	9	13	6	9	7	6	3	3	3	4	3	3	3	3	3	3	3	3	3	3	3	3	3	3	3	3

Source: See results
A = Away; H = Home; W = Win; D = Draw; L = Loss

===== Matches =====
23 July 2017 2	Lokomotiv Plovdiv	0–0	Levski Sofia	Plovdiv
21:00 EET	Umarbayev (yellow card) 42'; Markov (yellow card) 47' (yellow-red card) 66'	Report	Mapuku (yellow card) 46'	Stadium: Lokomotiv; Attendance: 1,650; Referee: Stanislav Todorov; Man of the Match: Jordi Gómez

30 July 2017 3	Levski Sofia	2–0	Vitosha Bistritsa	Sofia
21:00 EET	Vutov 2'; Buș 57'	Report	Otofe (yellow card) 49'	Stadium: Vivacom Arena - Georgi Asparuhov; Attendance: 1,640; Referee: Nikolay Kolev; Man of the Match: Antonio Vutov

5 August 2017 4	Vereya	2–0	Levski Sofia	Stara Zagora
18:45 EET	Andonov 3'; Bengyuzov (yellow card) 14', (goal) 29'	Report	Pirgov (yellow card) 9', (red card) 83'; Cvetković (yellow card) 40'	Stadium: Trace Arena; Attendance: 1,350; Referee: Vladimir Valkov; Man of the Match: Georgi Andonov

13 August 2017 5	Levski Sofia	2–0	Dunav Ruse	Sofia
21:00 EET	Jablonský 69'; Vutov (yellow card) 72'; Goranov (yellow card) 77'; Buș 90'	Report	Marem (yellow card) 38'; Hubchev (yellow card) 53'; Popadiyn (yellow card) 59'	Stadium: Vivacom Arena - Georgi Asparuhov; Attendance: 1,650; Referee: Volen Chinkov; Man of the Match: Gabriel Obertan

18 August 2017 6	Pirin Blagoevgrad	0–3	Levski Sofia	Blagoevgrad
21:00 EET	Kostadinov (yellow card) 8'; Bashliev (yellow card) 8'; Kirilov (yellow card) 22'; Palankov (yellow card) 45'; Nikolov (yellow card) 55'; Popev (yellow card) 75'; Sandev (red card) 77'; Trayanov (yellow card) 87'	Report	Gómez (yellow card) 17'; Buș (yellow card) 45+2'; Mapuku 74', 80', 90+3', (yellow card) 81'	Stadium: Hristo Botev; Attendance: 4,350; Referee: Nikolay Yordanov; Man of the Match: Junior Mapuku

26 August 2017 7	Levski Sofia	4–0	Slavia Sofia	Sofia
21:00 EET	Gómez 31' (pen.), 86', (yellow card) 59'; Mapuku (yellow card) 45+1', (goal) 45+3'; Buș 90+2'	Report	Velkov (yellow card) 58'; Uzunov (yellow card) 68'	Stadium: Vivacom Arena - Georgi Asparuhov; Attendance: 4,050; Referee: Ivaylo Stoyanov; Man of the Match: Jordi Gómez

6 September 2017 1	Levski Sofia	0–0	Ludogorets Razgrad	Sofia
20:00 EET	Mitrev (red card) 35'; Procházka (yellow card) 77'; Cvetković (yellow card) 88'	Report	Anicet (yellow card) 28'; Natanael (yellow card) 31'; Dyakov (yellow card) 76'; Cicinho (red card) 79'	Stadium: Vivacom Arena - Georgi Asparuhov; Attendance: 14,000; Referee: Nikola Popov; Man of the Match: Gabriel Obertan

10 September 2017 8	Botev Plovdiv	2–1	Levski Sofia	Plovdiv
20:00 EET	Nedelev 64', (yellow card) 81'; Tasev (yellow card) 68'; Serkan (yellow card) 74'; Baltanov 77'; Dimov (yellow card) 79'; Minev (yellow card) 80'	Report	Jablonský 26'; Panayotov (yellow card) 55'	Stadium: Botev 1912 Football Complex; Attendance: 3,300; Referee: Volen Chinkov; Man of the Match: Todor Nedelev

15 September 2017 9	Levski Sofia	2–0	Septemvri Sofia	Sofia
20:00 EET	Gómez (yellow card) 39'; Jablonský 44'; Panayotov (yellow card) 73'; Obertan 89'	Report	Sandanski (yellow card) 59'; Galchev (yellow card) 81'	Stadium: Vivacom Arena - Georgi Asparuhov; Attendance: 2,630; Referee: Angel Angelov; Man of the Match: Gabriel Obertan

25 September 2017 10	Beroe	0–0	Levski Sofia	Stara Zagora
17:30 EET	Eugénio (yellow card) 28'; Zhelev (yellow card) 64'	Report	Buș (yellow card) 8'; Procházka (yellow card) 28'; Cvetković (yellow card) 46'; Obertan (yellow card) 90+2'	Stadium: Beroe; Attendance: 5,150; Referee: Ivaylo Stoyanov; Man of the Match: Dušan Perniš

1 October 2017 11	Levski Sofia	1–0	Cherno More	Sofia
17:30 EET	Jablonský 12'	Report	Iliev (penalty missed) 11'; Tsvetkov (yellow card) 32'; Hassani (yellow card) 50'; Milanov (yellow card) 55'	Stadium: Vivacom Arena - Georgi Asparuhov; Attendance: 1,700; Referee: Stanislav Todorov; Man of the Match: David Jablonský

15 October 2017 12	Etar	0–1	Levski Sofia	Veliko Tarnovo
17:30 EET	Sarmov (yellow card) 57'; Aleksandrov (yellow card) 87'	Report	Jablonský 5'; Obertan (yellow card) 57'; Vutov (yellow card) 74'; Gómez (yellow card) 79'; Mitrev (yellow card) 90+1'	Stadium: Ivaylo; Attendance: 9,800; Referee: Dragomir Draganov; Man of the Match: David Jablonský

21 October 2017 13	Levski Sofia	2–2	CSKA Sofia	Sofia
16:00 EET	Jablonský 8'; Vutov (yellow card) 22'; Panayotov (yellow card) 27'; Eyjólfsson (yellow card) 35'; Procházka 61'; Goranov (yellow card) 74'	Report	Tiago 12', 15'; Malinov (yellow card) 23'; Nedyalkov (yellow card) 55'; Karanga (yellow card) 68'; Bodurov (yellow card) 86'	Stadium: Vasil Levski National Stadium; Attendance: 25,107; Referee: Georgi Kabakov; Man of the Match: Tiago Rodrigues

29 October 2017 14	Ludogorets Razgrad	2–0	Levski Sofia	Razgrad
18:15 EET	Misidjan 11', (yellow card) 41'; Wanderson 59'; Góralski (yellow card) 80'	Report	Orachev (yellow card) 18'; Panayotov (yellow card) 45+1'; Cabral (yellow card) 67'; Naydenov (yellow card) 82'	Stadium: Ludogorets Arena; Attendance: 4,380; Referee: Volen Chinkov; Man of the Match: Virgil Misidjan

4 November 2017 15	Levski Sofia	1–0	Lokomotiv Plovdiv	Sofia
17:30 EET	Gómez 38'; Goranov (red card) 42'; Cvetković (yellow card) 90'	Report	Muhammed (yellow card) 55'; Kiki (yellow card) 67'; Frikeche (yellow card) 75'; Krumov (yellow card) 76'; Martinović (yellow card) 90+2'	Stadium: Vivacom Arena - Georgi Asparuhov; Attendance: 1,430; Referee: Nikolay Yordanov; Man of the Match: Jordi Gómez

19 November 2017 16	Vitosha Bistritsa	0–0	Levski Sofia	Sofia
17:30 EET	Tsankov (yellow card) 43'; Ivanov (yellow card) 73'; Peev (yellow card) 74'	Report	Gómez (penalty missed) 44'; Eyjólfsson (yellow card) 90+3'	Stadium: Vasil Levski National Stadium; Attendance: 990; Referee: Georgi Davidov; Man of the Match: Mihail Ivanov

25 November 2017 17	Levski Sofia	1–0	Vereya	Sofia
17:30 EET	Eyjólfsson (yellow card) 60'; Gómez (yellow card) 82'; Jablonský 90'; Procházka (yellow card) 90+5'	Report	Baldé (yellow card) 43'; Domovchiyski (yellow card) 58'; Enchev (yellow card) 88'; Yordanov (yellow card) 90+1'; Argilashki (yellow card) 90+1', (red card) 90+2'	Stadium: Vivacom Arena - Georgi Asparuhov; Attendance: 690; Referee: Nikola Popov; Man of the Match: Georgi Argilashki

29 November 2017 18	Dunav Ruse	0–4	Levski Sofia	Ruse
17:30 EET		Report	Panayotov 33', 39'; Mapuku 46'; Eyjólfsson (yellow card) 50'; Buș 78'	Stadium: Gradski; Attendance: 2,100; Referee: Dragomir Draganov; Man of the Match: Vasil Panayotov

2 December 2017 19	Levski Sofia	3–0	Pirin Blagoevgrad	Sofia
17:30 EET	Procházka 21' (pen.); Mapuku 48'; Panayotov 78'; Gómez (yellow card) 83'	Report	Nikolov (yellow card) 19'; Sandev (yellow card) 25'; Souda (yellow card) 49' (yellow-red card) 71'	Stadium: Vivacom Arena - Georgi Asparuhov; Attendance: 490; Referee: Valentin Zhelezov; Man of the Match: Junior Mapuku

9 December 2017 20	Slavia Sofia	1–1	Levski Sofia	Sofia
17:30 EET	Hristov 82'; Milev (yellow card) 88'	Report	Buș 17', (yellow card) 88'; Gómez (yellow card) 63'	Stadium: Vasil Levski National Stadium; Attendance: 1,530; Referee: Georgi Dimitrov; Man of the Match: Roman Procházka

18 February 2018 21	Levski Sofia	1–0	Botev Plovdiv	Sofia
17:30 EET	Vutov (yellow card) 30'; Dimov 88' (o.g.); Jablonský (yellow card) 90+2'	Report	Panov (yellow card) 8'; Baltanov (yellow card) 58'; Dimov (yellow card) 82'; Steven (yellow card) 90+3'	Stadium: Vivacom Arena - Georgi Asparuhov; Attendance: 4,900; Referee: Stanislav Todorov; Man of the Match: Filipe Nascimento

24 February 2018 22	Septemvri Sofia	1–4	Levski Sofia	Sofia
17:30 EET	Meledje (yellow card) 13'; Fabiano (yellow card) 24'; Sandanski (yellow card) 58'; Dyakov (yellow card) 61'; Ivanov 84' (pen.)	Report	Thiam (yellow card) 16'; Kostov 29', 57'; Obertan 66', 90+1'	Stadium: Vasil Levski National Stadium; Attendance: 980; Referee: Stefan Apostolov; Man of the Match: Stanislav Kostov

3 March 2018 23	Levski Sofia	0–0	Beroe	Sofia
17:30 EET	Nascimento (yellow card) 10'; Obertan (yellow card) 63'; Eyjólfsson (yellow card) 90+2'	Report	Kamburov (yellow card) 21'; Tsonev (yellow card) 22'; Eugénio (yellow card) 43' (yellow-red card) 68'; Perniš (yellow card) 90+5'	Stadium: Vivacom Arena - Georgi Asparuhov; Attendance: 2,010; Referee: Nikolay Yordanov; Man of the Match: Martin Kamburov

7 March 2018 24	Cherno More	2–3	Levski Sofia	Varna
17:30 EET	Vasilev 22', 76', (yellow card) 82'; Ognyanov (yellow card) 27'; Hassani (yellow card) 27'; Dimov (yellow card) 58'; Tsvetkov (yellow card) 64'; Iliev (yellow card) 69'	Report	Vutov 21', (red card) 54'; Gómez (yellow card) 32'; Paulinho 38'; Jablonský 65'; Belaïd (yellow card) 69'; Cvetković (yellow card) 74'; Krastev (yellow card) 85'	Stadium: Ticha; Attendance: 3,080; Referee: Stanislav Todorov; Man of the Match: David Jablonský

11 March 2018 25	Levski Sofia	1–1	Etar	Sofia
17:30 EET	Buș 72'; Nascimento (yellow card) 78', (penalty missed) 90+4'	Report	Ivaylov (yellow card) 15'; Vasilev (yellow card) 33'; Batrović 61'; Rumenov (yellow card) 73'	Stadium: Vivacom Arena - Georgi Asparuhov; Attendance: 3,100; Referee: Ivaylo Stoyanov; Man of the Match: Sergiu Buș

18 March 2018 26	CSKA Sofia	1–0	Levski Sofia	Sofia
13:00 EET	Manolev (yellow card) 42'; Malinov (yellow card) 59'; Despodov (yellow card) 59'; Bodurov (yellow card) 66'; Gyasi (yellow card) 82'; Karanga 84'	Report	Eyjólfsson (yellow card) 34'; Goranov (yellow card) 55'; Jablonský (yellow card) 56'	Stadium: Vasil Levski National Stadium; Attendance: 16,500; Referee: Nikola Popov; Man of the Match: Fernando Karanga

==== League table ====
Pos	Team	Pld	W	D	L	GF	GA	GD	Pts	Qualification
1	Ludogorets Razgrad (C)	36	27	7	2	91	22	+69	88	Qualification for the Champions League first qualifying round
2	CSKA Sofia	36	24	9	3	80	26	+54	81	Qualification for the Europa League first qualifying round
3	Levski Sofia (O)	36	18	10	8	55	27	+28	64	Qualification for the European play-off final
4	Beroe	36	16	11	9	45	43	+2	59	
5	Botev Plovdiv	36	15	11	10	62	49	+13	56	
6	Vereya	36	10	6	20	27	61	−34	36	

Source: Soccerway
Rules for classification: 1) Points; 2) Head-to-head points; 3) Head-to-head goal difference; 4) Head-to-head goals scored; 5) Head-to-head away goals scored (only if two teams); 6) Goal difference; 7) Goals scored; 8) Fairplay ranking; 9) Draw.
(C) Champions; (O) Play-off winners

===== Results summary =====
Overall								Home						Away					
Pld	W	D	L	GF	GA	GD	Pts	W	D	L	GF	GA	GD	W	D	L	GF	GA	GD
10	4	2	4	18	13	+5	14	2	0	3	8	8	0	2	2	1	10	5	+5

Last updated: 31 May 2018.
Source: See Results

===== Results by round =====
Round	1	2	3	4	5	6	7	8	9	10
Ground	H	A	H	A	H	A	H	A	H	A
Result	L	L	L	D	W	W	W	D	L	W
Position	3	4	4	4	4	3	3	3	3	3

Source: See results
A = Away; H = Home; W = Win; D = Draw; L = Loss

==== Matches ====
1 April 2018 27	Levski Sofia	1–2	Beroe	Sofia
17:30 EET	Thiam (yellow card) 33'; Procházka (penalty missed) 45'; Buș 75'	Report	Eugénio 3'; Ivanov (yellow card) 44'; Hadzhiev 49'	Stadium: Vivacom Arena - Georgi Asparuhov; Attendance: 1,030; Referee: Stanislav Stavrov; Man of the Match: Kamen Hadzhiev

6 April 2018 28	Botev Plovdiv	1–0	Levski Sofia	Plovdiv
14:30 EET	Serkan (yellow card) 14'; Pirgov (red card) 41'; Steven 79', (yellow card) 80'	Report	Vutov (yellow card) 23'; Eyjólfsson (yellow card) 37'; Goranov (yellow card) 58'; Buș (yellow card) 90'	Stadium: Botev 1912 Football Complex; Attendance: 2,900; Referee: Petar Kostadinov; Man of the Match: Steven Petkov

14 April 2018 29	Levski Sofia	0–1	Ludogorets Razgrad	Sofia
20:00 EEST	Jablonský (yellow card) 40'; Thiam (yellow card) 56'	Report	Cicinho (yellow card) 26'; Keșerü (penalty missed) 52', 83'; Lucas Sasha (yellow card) 71'; Natanael (yellow card) 86'; Forster (yellow card) 90+1'	Stadium: Vivacom Arena - Georgi Asparuhov; Attendance: 5,200; Referee: Nikola Popov; Man of the Match: Claudiu Keșerü

18 April 2018 30	CSKA Sofia	2–2	Levski Sofia	Sofia
18:00 EEST	Karanga 6' (pen.); Henrique 9'; Geferson (red card) 83'; Manolev (yellow card) 88'; Atanasov (yellow card) 89'; Pinto (yellow card) 90'	Report	Cvetković (yellow card) 6'; Jablonský (yellow card) 21'; Goranov 48'; Paulinho 61'; Obertan (yellow card) 80'; Buș (red card) 83'	Stadium: Vasil Levski National Stadium; Attendance: 12,000; Referee: Stefan Apostolov; Man of the Match: Ivan Goranov

21 April 2018 31	Levski Sofia	2–0	Vereya	Sofia
15:00 EEST	Eyjólfsson 41'; Thiam (yellow card) 47'; Procházka 57'; Belaïd (yellow card) 90+3'	Report	Ndong (yellow card) 82'	Stadium: Vivacom Arena - Georgi Asparuhov; Attendance: 0 Referee: Georgi Kabakov; Man of the Match: Roman Procházka

29 April 2018 32	Beroe	0–4	Levski Sofia	Stara Zagora
17:45 EEST	Bandalovski (yellow card) 12'; Leoni (yellow card) 50'	Report	Jablonský 21'; Gómez 45'; Buș (yellow card) 68'; Procházka (yellow card) 77', (goal) 86'; Paulinho 89'	Stadium: Beroe; Attendance: 4,900; Referee: Valentin Zhelezov; Man of the Match: Jordi Gómez

4 May 2018 33	Levski Sofia	3–2	Botev Plovdiv	Sofia
20:00 EEST	Eyjólfsson (yellow card) 17'; Belaïd (yellow card) 52'; Paulinho 70', 90'; Afonso (yellow card) 72'; Rivaldinho 85' (pen.)	Report	Steven (yellow card) 15', (goal) 33'; João Paulo 31'; Filipov (yellow card) 53'	Stadium: Vivacom Arena - Georgi Asparuhov; Attendance: 3,200; Referee: Stefan Apostolov; Man of the Match: Paulinho

12 May 2018 34	Ludogorets Razgrad	2–2	Levski Sofia	Razgrad
18:00 EEST	Keșerü 5' (pen.); Góralski (yellow card) 13'; Belaïd 84' (o.g.); Misidjan (yellow card) 86'	Report	Jablonský (yellow card) 8'; Naydenov (yellow card) 53'; Procházka 73'; Cabral 88'	Stadium: Ludogorets Arena; Attendance: 7,400; Referee: Georgi Kabakov; Man of the Match: Roman Procházka

15 May 2018 35	Levski Sofia	2–3	CSKA Sofia	Sofia
18:30 EEST	Paulinho 35'; Cabral (yellow card) 40'; Goranov (yellow card) 54'; Belmonte (yellow card) 75'; Kostov 78'	Report	Henrique 19'; Atanasov (yellow card) 48'; Pinto (yellow card) 54', (goal) 90'; Malinov 57'; Bodurov (yellow card) 76'	Stadium: Vasil Levski National Stadium; Attendance: 7,900; Referee: Volen Chinkov; Man of the Match: Kristiyan Malinov

20 May 2018 36	Vereya	0–2	Levski Sofia	Stara Zagora
20:00 EEST		Report	Paulinho 59', 70'	Stadium: Trace Arena; Attendance: 900; Referee: Georgi Dimitrov; Man of the Match: Paulinho

==== European play-off final ====
24 May 2018	Levski Sofia	4–1	Cherno More	Sofia
20:30 EEST	Obertan 24'; Buș 39', (yellow card) 68'; Gómez (yellow card) 70'; Panayotov 73'; Jablonský (yellow card) 77'; Goranov 83' (pen.)	Report	Konongo (yellow card) 5'; Bozhilov (yellow card) 17'; Dimov (yellow card) 27'; Enchev (yellow card) 29'; Fennouche 55'; Iliev (yellow card) 76'; Vitanov (yellow card) 81'; Hassani (yellow card) 87'	Stadium: Vivacom Arena - Georgi Asparuhov; Attendance: 4,030; Referee: Georgi Kabakov; Man of the Match: Vasil Panayotov

=== Bulgarian Cup ===
19 September 2017 First round	Botev Galabovo	0–1 (a.e.t.)	Levski Sofia	Stara Zagora
19:00 EET	Tsachev (yellow card) 87'; Halil (yellow card) 90+2'; Orlinov (yellow card) 105'	Report	Goranov (yellow card) 57'; Vutov (yellow card) 102', (goal) 111'; Naydenov (yellow card) 110'	Stadium: Trace Arena; Attendance: 860; Referee: Stanislav Todorov

25 October 2017 Second round	Montana	0–1	Levski Sofia	Sofia
18:00 EET		Report	Georgiev 55' (o.g.); Mapuku (yellow card) 65'	Stadium: Vivacom Arena - Georgi Asparuhov; Attendance: 530; Referee: Stanimir Trenchev

15 December 2017 Quarterfinal	Dunav Ruse	0–2	Levski Sofia	Ruse
16:30 EET	Vasev (yellow card) 42'	Report	Mapuku 23'; Cabral 45'	Stadium: Gradski; Attendance: 2,700; Referee: Nikolay Yordanov

11 April 2018 Semifinal 1st leg	CSKA Sofia	0–2	Levski Sofia	Sofia
17:30 EEST	Bodurov (yellow card) 69'; Loé (yellow card) 81'; Henrique (yellow card) 85'	Report	Buș 7', 46', (yellow card) 81'; Nascimento (yellow card) 56'; Afonso (yellow card) 89'; Obertan (yellow card) 90+3'	Stadium: Vasil Levski National Stadium; Attendance: 20,000; Referee: Ivaylo Stoyanov

25 April 2018 Semifinal 2nd leg	Levski Sofia	2–2 (4–2 agg.)	CSKA Sofia	Sofia
18:30 EEST	Gómez 6'; Thiam (red card) 28'; Buș 65'; Paulinho (yellow card) 77'; Mitrev (yellow card) 90+1'	Report	Barthe (yellow card) 40'; Pinto (yellow card) 41'; Blanco 57'; Alberg 82'; Atanasov (yellow card) 88'; Geferson (yellow card) 88'	Stadium: Vasil Levski National Stadium; Attendance: 24,000; Referee: Nikolay Yordanov

9 May 2018 Final	Slavia Sofia	0–0 (a.e.t.) (4–2 p)	Levski Sofia	Sofia
19:30 EEST	Petkov (yellow card) 11'; Hristov (yellow card) 25'; Shokolarov (yellow card) 37'; Minchev (yellow card) 41'; Velev (yellow card) 43'; Chunchukov (yellow card) 80'; Yomov (yellow card) 98'	Report	Gómez (penalty missed) 12', (yellow card) 43'; Thiam (yellow card) 35'; Eyjólfsson (yellow card) 56'; Nascimento (yellow card) 59'	Stadium: Vasil Levski National Stadium; Attendance: 32,000; Referee: Nikola Popov
	Penalties
	Minchev (penalty scored); Angelov (penalty scored); Dimitrov (penalty missed); Velev (penalty scored); Yomov (penalty scored)		(penalty scored) Nascimento; (penalty missed) Thiam; (penalty missed) Procházka; (penalty scored) Vutov

=== UEFA Europa League ===
==== First qualifying round ====
29 June 2017 1st leg	Levski Sofia (Bulgaria)	3–1	(Montenegro) Sutjeska	Sofia, Bulgaria
20:00 EET	Mapuku 1', 21'; Procházka 45+1'; Jablonský (yellow card) 68'	Report	Radišić (yellow card) 23' (yellow-red card) 89'; Lončar (yellow card) 31'; Marković 79'; Bubanja (yellow card) 83'	Stadium: Vivacom Arena - Georgi Asparuhov; Attendance: 6,456; Referee: Martin Lundby (Norway)

6 July 2017 2nd leg	Sutjeska (Montenegro)	0–0 (1–3 agg.)	(Bulgaria) Levski Sofia	Nikšić, Montenegro
21:30 EET	Giljen (yellow card) 42'; Lončar (yellow card) 55'; Bakrač (yellow card) 82'	Report	Mapuku (yellow card) 42'	Stadium: Gradski; Attendance: 3,500; Referee: Dimitrios Massias (Cyprus)

==== Second qualifying round ====
13 July 2017 1st leg	Hajduk Split (Croatia)	1–0	(Bulgaria) Levski Sofia	Dugopolje, Croatia
21:30 EET	Futács 24' (pen.); Nižić (yellow card) 69'; Barry (yellow card) 72'; Memolla (yellow card) 82'	Report	Jablonský (yellow card) 20'; Goranov (yellow card) 55'; Panayotov (yellow card) 56'; Vutov (yellow card) 66'	Stadium: Hrvatski vitezovi Attendance: 5,000; Referee: Mohammed Al-Hakim (Sweden)

20 July 2017 2nd leg	Levski Sofia (Bulgaria)	1–2 (1–3 agg.)	(Croatia) Hajduk Split	Sofia, Bulgaria
20:00 EET	Cvetković (yellow card) 29'; Buș 69'	Report	López (yellow card) 61'; Ohandza 80'; Erceg 86'	Stadium: Vivacom Arena - Georgi Asparuhov; Attendance: 0 Referee: Ali Palabıyık (Turkey)

== Squad statistics ==
As of match played 20 May 2018

No.	Pos	Nat	Player	Total		Parva Liga		Bulgarian Cup		UEFA Europa League	
No.	Pos	Nat	Player	Apps	Goals	Apps	Goals	Apps	Goals	Apps	Goals
3	DF	(Tunisia) TUN	Aymen Belaid	6	0	6	0	0	0	0	0
4	DF	(Bulgaria) BUL	Ivan Goranov	35	1	27	1	3+1	0	4	0
5	DF	(Iceland) ISL	Hólmar Örn Eyjólfsson	29	1	23	1	6	0	0	0
6	MF	(Bulgaria) BUL	Ivaylo Naydenov	10	0	5+4	0	1	0	0	0
7	MF	(Brazil) BRA	Paulinho	18	8	12+3	8	3	0	0	0
8	AM	(Bulgaria) BUL	Antonio Vutov	33	3	22+4	2	2+3	1	2	0
9	FW	(Romania) ROU	Sergiu Buș	37	11	17+11	7	3+2	3	0+4	1
10	FW	(Brazil) BRA	Rivaldinho	8	1	4+4	1	0	0	0	0
11	MF	(France) FRA	Anthony Belmonte	13	0	4+6	0	2+1	0	0	0
12	GK	(Bulgaria) BUL	Petar Ivanov	1	0	1	0	0	0	0	0
13	MF	(Spain) ESP	Jordi Gomez	38	5	27+3	4	5+1	1	1+1	0
14	MF	(Senegal) SEN	Khaly Thiam	12	0	9	0	3	0	0	0
15	MF	(Slovakia) SVK	Roman Procházka	44	6	33+2	5	4+1	0	4	1
17	MF	(Bulgaria) BUL	Martin Petkov	0	0	0	0	0	0	0	0
19	DF	(Serbia) SRB	Miloš Cvetković	37	0	29	0	3+1	0	4	0
20	MF	(Portugal) POR	Filipe Nascimento	13	0	9+1	0	3	0	0	0
21	GK	(Bulgaria) BUL	Bozhidar Mitrev	41	0	31	0	6	0	4	0
24	DF	(Bulgaria) BUL	Tomislav Papazov	2	0	1+1	0	0	0	0	0
25	DF	(Portugal) POR	Afonso Figueiredo	7	0	5+1	0	1	0	0	0
26	MF	(Cape Verde) CPV	Jerson Cabral	26	2	10+11	1	2+3	1	0	0
28	DF	(Czech Republic) CZE	David Jablonský	34	9	29	9	1	0	4	0
29	FW	(Bulgaria) BUL	Stanislav Kostov	15	3	8+3	3	4	0	0	0
30	MF	(Romania) ROU	Neluț Roșu	9	0	6+1	0	0	0	2	0
32	AM	(France) FRA	Gabriel Obertan	35	3	26+4	3	5	0	0	0
71	MF	(Bulgaria) BUL	Vasil Panayotov	34	3	22+3	3	2+3	0	4	0
77	FW	(Bulgaria) BUL	Iliya Yurukov	3	0	1+2	0	0	0	0	0
89	GK	(Bulgaria) BUL	Nikolay Krastev	3	0	3	0	0	0	0	0
99	FW	(Bulgaria) BUL	Stanislav Ivanov	8	0	1+7	0	0	0	0	0
Players away from the club on loan:
	FW	(Bulgaria) BUL	Iliya Dimitrov	0	0	0	0	0	0	0	0
	DF	(Bulgaria) BUL	Galin Tashev	0	0	0	0	0	0	0	0
39	DF	(Bulgaria) BUL	Deyan Ivanov	0	0	0	0	0	0	0	0
	MF	(Bulgaria) BUL	Georgi Yanev	0	0	0	0	0	0	0	0
93	FW	(Bulgaria) BUL	Atanas Kabov	0	0	0	0	0	0	0	0
75	MF	(Bulgaria) BUL	Aleks Borimirov	5	0	0+1	0	1	0	0+3	0
24	GK	(Bulgaria) BUL	Aleksandar Lyubenov	2	0	1+1	0	0	0	0	0
55	MF	(Bulgaria) BUL	Georgi Angelov	6	0	4	0	0	0	1+1	0
Players who left Levski (Sofia) during the season:
26	FW	(France) FRA	Amadou Soukouna	0	0	0	0	0	0	0	0
29	GK	(Serbia) SRB	Bojan Jorgačević	0	0	0	0	0	0	0	0
7	FW	(Ghana) GHA	Francis Narh	6	0	0+2	0	0	0	4	0
17	FW	(Nigeria) NGA	Tunde Adeniji	5	0	0+1	0	0	0	2+2	0
23	DF	(Sweden) SWE	Simon Sandberg	0	0	0	0	0	0	0	0
14	DF	(Bulgaria) BUL	Miki Orachev	11	0	4+4	0	2	0	0+1	0
3	DF	(Bulgaria) BUL	Dimitar Pirgov	15	0	9	0	2	0	4	0
10	FW	(Democratic Republic of the Congo) COD	Junior Mapuku	26	9	7+12	6	3	1	4	2
