= 2016–17 PFC Levski Sofia season =

Levski Sofia
2016–17 season
- Chairman: Ivo Tonev (until 13 June 2016); Nikolay Iliev (until 30 August 2016); Spas Rusev (since 30 August 2016)
- Manager: Ljupko Petrović (until 22 October 2016); Elin Topuzakov (until 2 March 2017); Nikolay Mitov (since 2 March 2017)
- Stadium: Vivacom Arena - Georgi Asparuhov
- First League: 3rd
- Bulgarian Cup: Round of 16
- Europa League: Second qualifying round
- Top goalscorer: League: Bozhidar Kraev (11); All: Bozhidar Kraev (11)
- Highest home attendance: 17,000 v. Maribor (21 July 2016)
- Lowest home attendance: 400 v. Neftochimic (14 December 2016)
- Average home league attendance: 1,948
- Biggest win: 5–0 v. Lokomotiv Plovdiv (H)
- Biggest defeat: 0–3 v. CSKA Sofia (H, A)
Home colours	Away colours	Third colours

The 2016–17 season was Levski Sofia's 96th season in the First League. This article shows player statistics and all matches (official and friendly) that the club has played during the season.

== Transfers ==
=== In ===
No.	Pos.	Nat.	Name	Age	EU	Moving from	Type	Transfer window	Ends	Transfer fee	Source
3	DF	(Bulgaria)	Dimitar Pirgov	26	EU	(Bulgaria) Slavia Sofia	Free transfer	Summer	2018	Free	Levski TV
9	FW	(Bulgaria)	Iliyan Mitsanski	30	EU	(South Korea) Suwon	Free transfer	Summer	2017	Free	Levski.bg
10	FW	(Bulgaria)	Galin Ivanov	28	EU	(Turkey) Samsunspor	Free transfer	Summer	2017	Free	Levski.bg
11	FW	(Peru)	Jean Deza	22	Non-EU	(France) Montpellier	Free transfer	Summer	2018	Free	Levski TV
18	DF	(Bulgaria)	Anton Ognyanov	28	EU	(Bulgaria) Dunav Ruse	Transfer	Winter	2018	€0.025M	Levski.bg
20	FW	(Spain)	Añete	30	EU	(Azerbaijan) Neftchi Baku	Free transfer	Summer	2017+1	Free	Levski TV, Levski.bg
21	GK	(Serbia)	Ivan Čvorović	31	EU	(Bulgaria) Ludogorets Razgrad	Free transfer	Summer	2017+1	Free	Levski TV
21	GK	(Bulgaria)	Bozhidar Mitrev	29	EU	(Moldova) Sheriff Tiraspol	Free transfer	Winter	2018	Free	Levski.bg
23	DF	(Sweden)	Simon Sandberg	22	EU	(Sweden) Häcken	Transfer	Summer	2019	€0.1M	Levski TV
26	FW	(France)	Amadou Soukouna	24	EU	(Bulgaria) Vereya	Transfer	Winter	2019	Undisclosed	fcvereya.bg
28	DF	(Czech Republic)	David Jablonský	25	EU	(Russia) Tom Tomsk	Free transfer	Winter	2019	Free	Levski.bg
44	DF	(Bulgaria)	Viktor Genev	27	EU	(Belarus) Dinamo Minsk	Free transfer	Summer	2017	Free	Levski.bg

=== Out ===
No.	Pos.	Nat.	Name	Age	EU	Moving to	Type	Transfer window	Transfer fee	Source
9	FW	(Bulgaria)	Iliyan Mitsanski	31	EU	(Poland) Korona Kielce	Released	Winter	Free	
10	MF	(Spain)	Miguel Bedoya	30	EU	(Cyprus) Apollon Limassol	End of contract	Summer	Free	Apollon Limassol
10	FW	(Bulgaria)	Galin Ivanov	28	EU	(Bulgaria) Neftochimic	End of contract	Winter	Free	
11	FW	(Cameroon)	Justin Mengolo	23	Non-EU	(Hungary) Debrecen	Released	Summer	Free	Levski.bg
11	FW	(Peru)	Jean Deza	23	Non-EU		Sacked	Winter	Free	
18	MF	(Bulgaria)	Borislav Tsonev	21	EU	(Bulgaria) Beroe	End of contract	Summer	Free	gong.bg
21	MF	(Bulgaria)	Radoslav Tsonev	21	EU	(Italy) Lecce	End of contract	Summer	Free	gong.bg
21	GK	(Serbia)	Ivan Čvorović	31	EU	(Bulgaria) Botev Plovdiv	Released	Winter	Free	
30	DF	(Austria)	Maximilian Karner	26	EU	(Republic of Ireland) Derry City	Released	Summer	Free	gong.bg
44	DF	(Bulgaria)	Viktor Genev	28	EU	(Bulgaria) Botev Plovdiv	End of contract	Winter	Free	
91	FW	(Bulgaria)	Ventsislav Hristov	27	EU	(Bulgaria) Neftochimic	Released	Summer	Free	Levski.bg
	GK	(Bulgaria)	Aleksandar Lyubenov	21	EU	(Bulgaria) Lokomotiv Plovdiv	End of contract	Summer	Free	Lokomotiv Plovdiv

=== Loans out ===
No.	Pos.	Nat.	Name	Age	EU	Moving to	Type	Transfer window	Transfer fee	Source
	GK	(Bulgaria)	Nikolay Krastev	19	EU	(Bulgaria) Nesebar	Loan	Summer	—	
	DF	(Bulgaria)	Miki Orachev	20	EU	(Bulgaria) Lokomotiv Sofia	Loan	Winter	—	
	DF	(Bulgaria)	Galin Tashev	19	EU	(Bulgaria) Nesebar	Loan	Summer	—	
	DF	(Bulgaria)	Galin Tashev	19	EU	(Bulgaria) Etar	Loan	Summer	—	
	MF	(Bulgaria)	Georgi Yanev	19	EU	(Bulgaria) Spartak Pleven	Loan	Winter	—	
	FW	(Bulgaria)	Iliya Dimitrov	20	EU	(Bulgaria) Lokomotiv Sofia	Loan	Winter	—	
	FW	(Bulgaria)	Iliya Dimitrov	20	EU	(Bulgaria) Pirin Blagoevgrad	Loan	Summer	—	

== Squad ==
Updated on 4 May 2017.

No.	Name	Nationality	Position(s)	Age	EU	Since	Ends	Signed from	Transfer fee	Notes
Goalkeepers
1	Dimitar Sheytanov	Bulgaria	GK	26	EU	2016		Youth system	W/S	
21	Bozhidar Mitrev	Bulgaria	GK	38	EU	2017	2018	(Moldova) Sheriff Tiraspol	Free	Originally from Youth system
29	Bojan Jorgačević	Serbia	GK	43	EU	2015	2018	(Turkey) Erciyesspor	Free	Second nationality: Belgium
89	Nikolay Krastev	Bulgaria	GK	29	EU	2014	2020	Youth system	W/S	
Defenders
2	Srdjan Luchin	Romania	CB	39	EU	2016	2017	(Romania) Poli Timişoara	Free	
3	Dimitar Pirgov	Bulgaria	CB	36	EU	2016	2018	(Bulgaria) Slavia Sofia	Free	
4	Miki Orachev	Bulgaria	LB/LW	29	EU	2016	2018	Youth system	W/S	
5	Aleksandar Aleksandrov	Bulgaria	CB	39	EU	2016	2017	(Bulgaria) Ludogorets Razgrad	Free	
14	Veselin Minev	Bulgaria	LB	45	EU	2014	2017	(Bulgaria) Botev Plovdiv	Free	Originally from Youth system
18	Anton Ognyanov	Bulgaria	LB/LW	37	EU	2017	2018	(Bulgaria) Dunav Ruse	€0.025M	
23	Simon Sandberg	Sweden	CB/RB	31	EU	2016	2019	(Sweden) Häcken	€0.1M	
25	Sasho Aleksandrov	Bulgaria	RB	39	EU	2015		(Bulgaria) Cherno More	Free	
28	David Jablonský	Czech Republic	CB/RB/LB	34	EU	2017	2019	(Russia) Tom Tomsk	Free	
39	Deyan Ivanov	Bulgaria	CB	29	EU	2014	2020	Youth system	W/S	
Midfielders
6	Ivaylo Naydenov	Bulgaria	DM	27	EU	2016		Youth system	W/S	
8	Jeremy de Nooijer	Curaçao	DM/CM	33	EU	2015	2017	(Netherlands) Sparta Rotterdam	Free	Second nationality: Netherlands
12	Bozhidar Kraev	Bulgaria	AM/RW	28	EU	2014	2018	Youth system	W/S	
15	Roman Procházka	Slovakia	CM/RW/RB	36	EU	2014	2018	(Slovakia) Spartak Trnava	€0.12M	
24	Iliya Yurukov	Bulgaria	CM	26	EU	2016		Youth system	W/S	
27	Mehdi Bourabia	France	CM	34	EU	2016	2019	(Bulgaria) Cherno More	€0.1M	
70	Georgi Kostadinov	Bulgaria	DM/CM	35	EU	2015	2017	(Bulgaria) Beroe	Free	
75	Aleks Borimirov	Bulgaria	CM	27	EU	2016		Youth system	W/S	
Strikers
7	Francis Narh	Ghana	LW	32	Non-EU	2016	2019	(Czech Republic) Baník Ostrava	€0.2M	
16	Atanas Kabov	Bulgaria	RW	26	EU	2016		Youth system	W/S	
17	Tunde Adeniji	Nigeria	CF	30	Non-EU	2016	2019	(Nigeria) Sunshine Stars	€0.12M	
20	Añete	Spain	CF/AM	40	EU	2016	2017+1	(Azerbaijan) Neftchi Baku	Free	
26	Amadou Soukouna	France	CF	33	EU	2016	2019	(Bulgaria) Vereya	Undisclosed	
99	Stanislav Ivanov	Bulgaria	RW/CF/AM	26	EU	2016		Youth system	W/S	

== Fixtures ==
Win Draw Loss Upcoming fixture

== Performance overview ==
Competition	First match	Last match	Starting round	Final position	Record							
Competition	First match	Last match	Starting round	Final position	Pld	W	D	L	GF	GA	GD	Win %
First League	31 July 2016	4 June 2017	Matchday 1	3rd	36	18	9	9	50	31	+19	50.00
Bulgarian Cup	22 September 2016	26 October 2016	Round of 32	Round of 16	2	1	0	1	4	3	+1	50.00
UEFA Europa League	14 July 2016	21 July 2016	Second qualifying round	Second qualifying round	2	0	2	0	1	1	+0	0.00
Total					40	19	11	10	55	35	+20	47.50

Source: Fixtures

=== Friendlies ===
==== Summer ====
24 June 2016	Levski Sofia	3–1	Septemvri Sofia	Pravets
19:00 EET	Hristov 17' (pen.); S. Ivanov 62'; Adeniji 88'	Report	Tonchev 58'	Stadium: Pravets Sport Complex

29 June 2016	Levski Sofia	3–2	Dunav Ruse	Pravets
18:30 EET	Kraev 35'; Kostadinov 75'; Adeniji 80'	Report	Budinov 75'; Dimov 88' (pen.)	Stadium: Pravets Sport Complex

3 July 2016	Radnik Surdulica (Serbia)	0–0	(Bulgaria) Levski Sofia	Surdulica
21:00 EET		Report		Stadium: Surdulica City Stadium

7 July 2016	Levski Sofia	1–0	Cherno More	Pravets
19:00 EET	Añete 90+1'	Report		Stadium: Pravets Sport Complex

27 July 2016	Levski Sofia	2–1	Vitosha Bistritsa	Sofia
19:00 EET	Adeniji 2', 6'		Kochilov 42'	Stadium: Georgi Asparuhov

==== Mid-season ====
6 September 2016	Lokomotiv Sofia	1–2	Levski Sofia	Sofia
17:00 EET	Georgiev 27'		Sandberg 5'; Narh 83'	Stadium: Lokomotiv

8 October 2016	Levski Sofia (Bulgaria)	0–2	(Turkey) Galatasaray	Sofia
19:00 EET			Josué 11'; Altıntop 67'	Stadium: Georgi Asparuhov

12 November 2016	Levski Sofia	2–0	Septemvri Sofia	Sofia
16:00 EET	Mitsanski 4', 50'			Stadium: Georgi Asparuhov

==== Winter ====
20 January 2017	Levski Sofia (Bulgaria)	1–2	(Romania) Viitorul Constanța	Deryneia, Cyprus
18:30 EET	S. Aleksandrov 86'	Report	Nimely 7'; Purece 18'	Stadium: Anagennisi Football Ground

29 January 2017	Levski Sofia (Bulgaria)	2–1	(Hungary) Újpest	Paralimni, Cyprus
15:00 EET	Adeniji 43', 51'	Report	Hazard 58'	Stadium: Tasos Markou

2 February 2017	Levski Sofia (Bulgaria)	1–0	(Russia) Ufa	Dromolaxia, Cyprus
14:45 EET	Kraev 51'			Stadium: Alpha Sport Field

5 February 2017	Levski Sofia (Bulgaria)	0–1	(Czech Republic) Teplice	Paralimni, Cyprus
15:00 EET		Report	Vachoušek 90+2'	Stadium: Tasos Markou

8 February 2017	Levski Sofia (Bulgaria)	1–1	(Serbia) Partizan	Limassol, Cyprus
16:00 EET	Procházka 57'	Report	Jovanović 69'

=== Parva Liga ===
==== Preliminary stage ====
===== League table =====
Pos	Team	Pld	W	D	L	GF	GA	GD	Pts	Qualification
1	Ludogorets Razgrad	26	21	4	1	69	19	+50	67	Qualification for the championship round
2	Levski Sofia	26	15	6	5	38	17	+21	51	Qualification for the championship round
3	CSKA Sofia	26	13	7	6	35	16	+19	46	Qualification for the championship round
4	Cherno More	26	12	7	7	30	24	+6	43	Qualification for the championship round
5	Lokomotiv Plovdiv	26	10	9	7	35	30	+5	39	Qualification for the championship round

Source: Bulgarian Football Union, Soccerway
Rules for classification: 1) Points; 2) Head-to-head points; 3) Head-to-head goal difference; 4) Head-to-head goals scored; 5) Head-to-head away goals scored (only if two teams); 6) Goal difference; 7) Goals scored; 8) Fairplay ranking; 9) Draw.

===== Results summary =====
Overall								Home						Away					
Pld	W	D	L	GF	GA	GD	Pts	W	D	L	GF	GA	GD	W	D	L	GF	GA	GD
26	15	6	5	38	17	+21	51	10	2	1	20	4	+16	5	4	4	18	13	+5

Last updated: 3 April 2017.
Source: See results

===== Results by round =====
Round	1	2	3	4	5	6	7	8	9	10	11	12	13	14	15	16	17	18	19	20	21	22	23	24	25	26
Ground	H	A	H	A	H	A	H	A	H	A	H	A	H	A	H	A	H	A	H	A	H	A	H	A	H	A
Result	D	D	W	W	W	W	W	W	W	D	W	D	W	W	L	L	W	W	W	L	D	D	W	L	W	L
Position	5	8	6	3	2	2	1	1	1	1	1	1	2	2	2	2	2	2	2	2	2	2	2	2	2	2

Source: See results
A = Away; H = Home; W = Win; D = Draw; L = Loss

===== Matches =====
31 July 2016 1	Levski Sofia	0–0	Montana	Sofia
19:00 EET	Orachev (yellow card) 90+3'	Report	Korudzhiev (yellow card) 18'; Chipev (yellow card) 39'; Atanasov (yellow card) 72'; H. Ivanov (yellow card) 90+1'	Stadium: Georgi Asparuhov; Attendance: 2,380; Referee: Dragomir Draganov (Varna)

7 August 2016 2	Lokomotiv Plovdiv	2–2	Levski Sofia	Plovdiv
19:00 EET	Marchev 3', (yellow card) 49'; Kamburov 65' (pen.); Souda (yellow card) 90+3'	Report	Narh 12', (yellow card) 51'; Adeniji 13'; S. Aleksandrov (yellow card) 35'; Pirgov (yellow card) 58'; Sandberg (yellow card) 64' de Nooijer (yellow card) 72'	Stadium: Lokomotiv; Attendance: 3,550; Referee: Nikola Popov (Sofia)

13 August 2016 3	Levski Sofia	1–0	Ludogorets Razgrad	Sofia
21:15 EET	Añete (yellow card) 13'; Kostadinov (yellow card) 32'; Pirgov (yellow card) 63'; Minev (yellow card) 76'; Kraev 90+1'; Jorgačević (yellow card) 90+4'; Bourabia (yellow card) 90+5'	Report	Cicinho (yellow card) 13'; Moți (yellow card) 71'; Quixadá (yellow card) 90+3'	Stadium: Georgi Asparuhov; Attendance: 4,941; Referee: Ivaylo Stoyanov (Petrich)

21 August 2016 4	Slavia Sofia	0–4	Levski Sofia	Sofia
21:15 EET	Vasev (yellow card) 64'	Report	Añete 21'; Adeniji 41'; Narh (yellow card) 54'; Kostadinov 62'; Kraev 82'	Stadium: Vasil Levski National Stadium; Attendance: 2,700; Referee: Nikolay Yordanov (Sofia)

28 August 2016 5	Levski Sofia	4–0	Vereya	Sofia
19:00 EET	Narh 7'; Kraev 20'; Hassani 78' (o.g.); Añete 83'	Report	Iliev (yellow card) 65'	Stadium: Georgi Asparuhov; Attendance: 1,650; Referee: Angel Bayaltsaliev (Sofia)

10 September 2016 6	Neftochimic	1–2	Levski Sofia	Burgas
21:15 EET	Bozhinov (yellow card) 24'; Ranđelović (yellow card) 24'; Granchov (yellow card) 51'; Valchanov 53'; Velkov (yellow card) 90+2'	Report	Procházka 24' (pen.), 90+3' (pen.) de Nooijer (yellow card) 42'; Adeniji (yellow card) 60'; Kraev (yellow card) 64'; A. Aleksandrov (yellow card) 90+8'	Stadium: Lazur; Attendance: 2,300; Referee: Volen Chinkov (Sofia)

17 September 2016 7	Levski Sofia	2–0	Pirin Blagoevgrad	Sofia
19:00 EET	Pirgov 18'; Adeniji 26'; Bourabia (yellow card) 63'; Mitsanski (yellow card) 80'	Report		Stadium: Georgi Asparuhov; Attendance: 1,500; Referee: Vladimir Valkov (Plovdiv)

26 September 2016 8	Lokomotiv Gorna Oryahovitsa	0–1	Levski Sofia	Plovdiv
20:00 EET	Hristov (yellow card) 14'; Tsonkov (yellow card) 30'; Mechev (yellow card) 42'; Genkov (yellow card) 44'; Uzunov (yellow card) 56'	Report	Kostadinov (yellow card) 11'; Kavdanski 45+1' (o.g.); Añete (yellow card) 79'	Stadium: Lokomotiv; Attendance: 480; Referee: Stefan Apostolov (Simitli)

2 October 2016 9	Levski Sofia	2–0	Dunav Ruse	Sofia
17:45 EET	Kostadinov 22', 56', (yellow card) 30'; Procházka (yellow card) 59'	Report	Milchev (yellow card) 35'; Patev (yellow card) 85'	Stadium: Georgi Asparuhov; Attendance: 4,000; Referee: Tasko Taskov (Sofia)

15 October 2016 10	CSKA Sofia	1–1	Levski Sofia	Sofia
16:30 EET	Nedyalkov (yellow card) 54'; Yordanov 76' (pen.); Boumal (yellow card) 86'; Viana (yellow card) 90+3'	Report	Adeniji (yellow card) 22'; Narh 34'; Procházka (yellow card) 51'; S. Aleksandrov (yellow card) 69'; Jorgačević (yellow card) 76'	Stadium: Vasil Levski National Stadium; Attendance: 21,000; Referee: Ivaylo Stoyanov (Petrich)

22 October 2016 11	Levski Sofia	2–0	Beroe	Sofia
17:30 EET	Añete 64'; Kostadinov 81'	Report	Tsonev (yellow card) 52'; Ohene (yellow card) 63'; Vasilev (yellow card) 67'	Stadium: Georgi Asparuhov; Attendance: 1,040; Referee: Stanislav Todorov (Shumen)

30 October 2016 12	Botev Plovdiv	1–1	Levski Sofia	Plovdiv
17:30 EET	João Paulo 1'; Zlatkov (yellow card) 41'; Meledje (yellow card) 50'	Report	Procházka 38', (yellow card) 71'; Pirgov (yellow card) 85'; G. Ivanov (yellow card) 90+2'	Stadium: Botev 1912 Football Complex; Attendance: 2,580; Referee: Dragomir Draganov

4 November 2016 13	Levski Sofia	1–0	Cherno More	Sofia
17:30 EET	Procházka 22', (yellow card) 88'; Adeniji (yellow card) 52'; Minev (yellow card) 60'; Deza (yellow card) 78'	Report	Tsvetkov (yellow card) 40'; Bacari (yellow card) 78'; Stanchev (yellow card) 84'; Sukup (yellow card) 85'	Stadium: Georgi Asparuhov; Attendance: 680; Referee: Stefan Apostolov

20 November 2016 14	Montana	1–3	Levski Sofia	Lovech
17:30 EET	Dyakov 41'	Report	Kraev 32'; Pirgov 60'; S. Aleksandrov (yellow card) 64'; Mitsanski 90+2'	Stadium: Gradski; Attendance: 980; Referee: Angel Angelov

26 November 2016 15	Levski Sofia	1–2	Lokomotiv Plovdiv	Sofia
15:00 EET	El Kharroubi 19' (o.g.); Mitsanski (yellow card) 90'	Report	Marchev 26'; El Kharroubi (yellow card) 29'; Trajanov (yellow card) 56'; Luque (yellow card) 63'; Vidanov (yellow card) 73'; Kamburov 78' (pen.); Hammoud (yellow card) 79'	Stadium: Georgi Asparuhov; Attendance: 2,330; Referee: Georgi Dimitrov

30 November 2016 16	Ludogorets Razgrad	2–1	Levski Sofia	Razgrad
17:30 EET	Cafú (yellow card) 18'; Wanderson 70'; Marcelinho 81'	Report	Adeniji 6'; S. Aleksandrov (yellow card) 17'; Añete (yellow card) 54'; Pirgov (yellow card) 61' de Nooijer (yellow card) 77'; G. Ivanov (yellow card) 81'	Stadium: Ludogorets Arena; Attendance: 2,480; Referee: Stanislav Todorov

3 December 2016 17	Levski Sofia	1–0	Slavia Sofia	Sofia
17:30 EET	Luchin (yellow card) 41'; Bourabia 83'	Report	Hristov (yellow card) 34'; Vasev (yellow card) 37'; Serderov (yellow card) 68', (red card) 68'; Martinov (yellow card) 68'	Stadium: Georgi Asparuhov; Attendance: 470; Referee: Nikolay Yordanov

10 December 2016 18	Vereya	0–1	Levski Sofia	Stara Zagora
15:00 EET	Elias (yellow card) 23' (yellow-red card) 45+1'; Hassani (yellow card) 30'; Soukouna (yellow card) 71'; Kaloyanov (yellow card) 90+3'	Report	Añete 68'; Minev (yellow card) 90+4'	Stadium: Trace Arena; Attendance: 750; Referee: Stefan Apostolov

14 December 2016 19	Levski Sofia	1–0	Neftochimic	Sofia
17:30 EET	de Nooijer (yellow card) 29'; Bourabia (yellow card) 31'; Adeniji 47'; Genev (yellow card) 68'; Kraev (yellow card) 83'	Report	Dyulgerov (yellow card) 38'	Stadium: Georgi Asparuhov; Attendance: 400; Referee: Vladimir Valkov

18 February 2017 20	Pirin Blagoevgrad	1–0	Levski Sofia	Blagoevgrad
15:00 EET	Souda 64'; A. Kostadinov (yellow card) 80'	Report	G. Kostadinov (yellow card) 45+3'; Sandberg (yellow card) 55'; Bourabia (yellow card) 74'	Stadium: Hristo Botev; Attendance: 4,800; Referee: Stanislav Todorov

25 February 2017 21	Levski Sofia	1–1	Lokomotiv Gorna Oryahovitsa	Sofia
17:30 EET	Ognyanov (yellow card) 40'; Adeniji 47'; Minev (yellow card) 70'; Jablonský (yellow card) 87'; S. Aleksandrov (yellow card) 89'	Report	Uzunov (yellow card) 56'; Ndong (yellow card) 56'; Kifouéti 58'; Zhelev (yellow card) 67'	Stadium: Vivacom Arena - Georgi Asparuhov; Attendance: 2,300; Referee: Stefan Apostolov

28 February 2017 22	Dunav Ruse	2–2	Levski Sofia	Razgrad
15:00 EET	Karagaren 8'; Budinov 39'; Dzhalilov (yellow card) 53'; Milchev (yellow card) 90'	Report	Ognyanov (yellow card) 12', (goal) 36'; Kostadinov (yellow card) 21'; Procházka 54' (pen.)	Stadium: Ludogorets Arena; Attendance: 1,900; Referee: Ivaylo Stoyanov

4 March 2017 23	Levski Sofia	2–1	CSKA Sofia	Sofia
14:30 EET	Adeniji (yellow card) 11'; Krastev (yellow card) 12'; Añete (yellow card) 26'; Bourabia (yellow card) 60'; Procházka 71' (pen.); Jablonský 76'	Report	Arsénio 5'; Pinto (yellow card) 26'; Bodurov (yellow card) 29'; Nedyalkov (yellow card) 45+3'; Karanga (yellow card) 50'; Boumal (yellow card) 55'	Stadium: Vasil Levski National Stadium; Attendance: 21,000; Referee: Nikola Popov

12 March 2017 24	Beroe	1–0	Levski Sofia	Stara Zagora
15:00 EET	Raynov 13'; Zehirov (yellow card) 28'; Kato (yellow card) 39'; Tenev (yellow card) 60'; Karachanakov (yellow card) 60'	Report	S. Aleksandrov (yellow card) 18'	Stadium: Beroe; Attendance: 4,030; Referee: Nikolay Yordanov

19 March 2017 25	Levski Sofia	2–0	Botev Plovdiv	Sofia
17:30 EET	Procházka 16'; Ognyanov (yellow card) 28'; Adeniji 63'; Jablonský (yellow card) 71'	Report	Vutov (yellow card) 8'; Meledje (yellow card) 60'; Viana (yellow card) 71'	Stadium: Vivacom Arena - Georgi Asparuhov; Attendance: 1,780; Referee: Volen Chinkov

1 April 2017 26	Cherno More	1–0	Levski Sofia	Kavarna
17:30 EET	Tsvetkov 68'	Report	Kostadinov (yellow card) 66'; Jablonský (red card) 87'	Stadium: Kavarna; Attendance: 2,510; Referee: Stanislav Todorov

==== Championship stage ====
===== League table =====
Pos	Team	Pld	W	D	L	GF	GA	GD	Pts	Qualification
1	Ludogorets Razgrad (C)	36	25	8	3	87	28	+59	83	Qualification for the Champions League second qualifying round
2	CSKA Sofia (Note: On 29 May 2017 a UEFA letter to the Bulgarian Football Union declared that CSKA Sofia were not allowed to compete in European tournaments for the following two seasons as they were considered to have been re-formed as a new club and thus did not pass the "three-year rule". As this decision was appealed by CSKA Sofia, the Bulgarian Football Union granted a license to them subject to legal proceedings. A few hours prior to the Europa League first qualifying round draw, UEFA replaced them by Dunav Ruse, the fourth-placed team of the league.)	36	19	10	7	51	21	+30	67	
3	Levski Sofia (O)	36	18	9	9	50	31	+19	63	Qualification for the European play-off final
4	Dunav Ruse	36	15	10	11	46	44	+2	55	Qualification for the Europa League first qualifying round
5	Lokomotiv Plovdiv	36	14	10	12	50	52	−2	52	
6	Cherno More Varna	36	13	8	15	39	45	−6	47	

Source: Soccerway
Rules for classification: 1) Points; 2) Head-to-head points; 3) Head-to-head goal difference; 4) Head-to-head goals scored; 5) Head-to-head away goals scored (only if two teams); 6) Goal difference; 7) Goals scored; 8) Fairplay ranking; 9) Draw.
(C) Champions; (O) Play-off winners

===== Results summary =====
Overall								Home						Away					
Pld	W	D	L	GF	GA	GD	Pts	W	D	L	GF	GA	GD	W	D	L	GF	GA	GD
10	3	3	4	12	14	−2	12	1	2	2	9	9	0	2	1	2	3	5	−2

Last updated: 31 May 2017.
Source: See results

===== Results by round =====
Round	1	2	3	4	5	6	7	8	9	10
Ground	H	A	H	H	A	A	H	A	A	H
Result	W	D	D	L	W	L	L	W	L	D
Position	2	2	2	3	3	3	3	3	3	3

Source: See results
A = Away; H = Home; W = Win; D = Draw; L = Loss

===== Results =====
9 April 2017 27	Levski Sofia	5–0	Lokomotiv Plovdiv	Sofia
17:30 EEST	Añete 12'; Kraev 36', 39', 51', 70'	Report	Marchev (yellow card) 43'; Luque (yellow card) 60'; Jevtoski (yellow card) 63'	Stadium: Vivacom Arena - Georgi Asparuhov; Attendance: 1,880; Referee: Stefan Apostolov

14 April 2017 28	Ludogorets Razgrad	0–0	Levski Sofia	Razgrad
20:00 EEST	Keșerü (yellow card) 47'	Report	Pirgov (yellow card) 7'; Minev (yellow card) 34'; Bourabia (yellow card) 61' (yellow-red card) 79'; Luchin (yellow card) 66'; Ognyanov (yellow card) 71'	Stadium: Ludogorets Arena; Attendance: 5,750; Referee: Ivaylo Stoyanov

22 April 2017 29	Levski Sofia	1–1	Dunav Ruse	Sofia
20:00 EEST	Budinov 6' (o.g.)	Report	Shopov (yellow card) 21'; Milchev (yellow card) 22'; Hubchev (yellow card) 71'; Ayass 76'	Stadium: Vivacom Arena - Georgi Asparuhov; Attendance: 620; Referee: Stanislav Todorov

29 April 2017 30	Levski Sofia	0–3	CSKA Sofia	Sofia
17:00 EEST	Bourabia (yellow card) 13' de Nooijer (yellow card) 62'; Narh (yellow card) 65'; Pirgov (yellow card) 90+5'; Procházka (red card) 90+5'	Report	Arsénio 2'; Despodov 6', (yellow card) 49'; Karanga 53'; Simão (yellow card) 62'; Culma (yellow card) 90'; Pinto (yellow card) 90+2'; Malinov (red card) 90+5'	Stadium: Vasil Levski National Stadium; Attendance: 11,200; Referee: Nikola Popov

7 May 2017 31	Cherno More	0–1	Levski Sofia	Kavarna
17:30 EET	Tsvetkov (yellow card) 35'; Sukup (yellow card) 57' (yellow-red card) 68'; Venkov (yellow card) 87'	Report	Soukouna 39', (yellow card) 70'; Jablonský (yellow card) 42'; Narh (yellow card) 65'	Stadium: Kavarna; Attendance: 1,100; Referee: Angel Angelov

12 May 2017 32	Lokomotiv Plovdiv	2–1	Levski Sofia	Plovdiv
20:00 EEST	Kamburov 32'; Umarbayev (yellow card) 56'; Jevtoski 64', (yellow card) 78'	Report	Bourabia 56'; Jablonský (yellow card) 71'	Stadium: Lokomotiv; Attendance: 1,630; Referee: Stanislav Todorov

16 May 2017 33	Levski Sofia	1–3	Ludogorets Razgrad	Sofia
20:00 EEST	Ognyanov (yellow card) 28'; Jablonský 31'; S. Aleksandrov (yellow card) 48'; Bourabia (yellow card) 53'	Report	Marcelinho 21'; Wanderson 23', 70'; Natanael (yellow card) 52'	Stadium: Vivacom Arena - Georgi Asparuhov; Attendance: 2,400; Referee: Stefan Apostolov

20 May 2017 34	Dunav Ruse	0–1	Levski Sofia	Ruse
15:30 EEST	Ayass (yellow card) 52'; Hubchev (yellow card) 90+4'	Report	Naydenov (yellow card) 21'; Minev (yellow card) 51'; Kraev 74'; Kabov (yellow card) 78'; A. Aleksandrov (yellow card) 82'	Stadium: Gradski; Attendance: 10,000; Referee: Volen Chinkov

17 May 2017 35	CSKA Sofia	3–0	Levski Sofia	Sofia
18:30 EEST	Simão 1', 82', (yellow card) 49'; Malinov (yellow card) 25'; Culma 67', (yellow card) 72'	Report	Jablonský (yellow card) 23'; S. Aleksandrov (yellow card) 46'	Stadium: Vasil Levski National Stadium; Attendance: 13,600; Referee: Georgi Kabakov

31 May 2017 36	Levski Sofia	2–2	Cherno More	Sofia
20:00 EEST	Kraev 74'; Procházka 81'	Report	Tsvetkov (yellow card) 11'; Yoskov (yellow card) 17'; Kostadinov 40'; Kasabov 77'; Sukup (yellow card) 83'	Stadium: Vivacom Arena - Georgi Asparuhov; Attendance: 650; Referee: Nikolay Kolev

==== European play-off final ====
4 June 2017	Levski Sofia	1–1 (a.e.t.) (9–8 p)	Vereya	Sofia
20:00 EEST	Kraev 44'; Bourabia (yellow card) 89'; Jablonský (yellow card) 103'	Report	Angelov (yellow card) 11'; Andonov (yellow card) 13'; Bengyuzov (yellow card) 40'; Bandalovski 90+3'; Domovchiyski (yellow card) 100'; Elias (yellow card) 107'; Eugénio (yellow card) 117'	Stadium: Vivacom Arena - Georgi Asparuhov; Attendance: 2,100; Referee: Stefan Apostolov
	Penalties
	Procházka (penalty scored); Kraev (penalty scored); Bourabia (penalty missed); S. Aleksandrov (penalty missed); Borimirov (penalty scored); Ognyanov (penalty scored); Jablonský (penalty scored); Pirgov (penalty scored); S. Ivanov (penalty scored); Mitrev (penalty scored); Naydenov (penalty scored)		Andonov (penalty scored); Domovchiyski (penalty scored); Tsvetanov (penalty scored); Eugénio (penalty missed); Elias (penalty missed); Zafirov (penalty scored); Kerkar (penalty scored); Angelov (penalty scored); Bandalovski (penalty scored); Inkoom (penalty scored); Kolev (penalty missed)

=== Bulgarian Cup ===
22 September 2016 First round	Tsarsko Selo	0–2	Levski Sofia	Sofia
16:00 EEST	Kremenliev (yellow card) 16'; Daskalov (yellow card) 31' (yellow-red card) 71'; Minkov (yellow card) 48'	Report	Procházka (yellow card) 56'; Adeniji 76'; Deza 90+3'	Stadium: Lokomotiv; Attendance: 1,300; Referee: Stefan Pavlov

26 October 2016 Second round	Levski Sofia	2–3 (a.e.t.)	Cherno More	Sofia
19:00 EET	Pirgov (yellow card) 56', (goal) 79'; Adeniji 63'; Kostadinov (yellow card) 81'; Deza (yellow card) 96'; Bourabia (yellow card) 104'	Report	Tsvetkov 3', 101'; Bacari 31'; Iliev (yellow card) 51'; Nikolov (yellow card) 88'	Stadium: Georgi Asparuhov; Attendance: 1,190; Referee: Volen Chinkov

=== UEFA Europa League ===
==== Second qualifying round ====
14 July 2016 1st leg	Maribor (Slovenia)	0–0	(Bulgaria) Levski Sofia	Maribor, Slovenia
21:00 EET		Report	Hristov (yellow card) 31'; Kostadinov (yellow card) 35'; Jorgačević (yellow card) 65'	Stadium: Ljudski vrt Attendance: 7,345; Referee: Cristian Balaj (Romania)

21 July 2016 2nd leg	Levski Sofia (Bulgaria)	1–1 (1–1 (a) agg.)	(Slovenia) Maribor	Sofia, Bulgaria
20:00 EET	S. Aleksandrov (yellow card) 6'; Narh 22', (yellow card) 90'; Kostadinov (yellow card) 65'	Report	Kabha (yellow card) 47'; Tavares 68'; Hotić (yellow card) 75'; Šuler (yellow card) 81'	Stadium: Georgi Asparuhov; Attendance: 17,600; Referee: Michael Tykgaard (Denmark)

== Squad statistics ==
As of match played 4 June 2017

No.	Pos	Nat	Player	Total		Parva Liga		Bulgarian Cup		UEFA Europa League	
No.	Pos	Nat	Player	Apps	Goals	Apps	Goals	Apps	Goals	Apps	Goals
1	GK	(Bulgaria) BUL	Dimitar Sheytanov	0	0	0	0	0	0	0	0
3	DF	(Bulgaria) BUL	Dimitar Pirgov	33	3	26+3	2	2	1	2	0
5	DF	(Bulgaria) BUL	Aleksandar Aleksandrov	18	0	15	0	1	0	2	0
6	MF	(Bulgaria) BUL	Ivaylo Naydenov	10	0	6+4	0	0	0	0	0
7	FW	(Ghana) GHA	Francis Narh	41	4	32+5	3	2	0	2	1
8	MF	(Curaçao) CUW	Jeremy de Nooijer	25	0	21	0	1+1	0	2	0
12	AM	(Bulgaria) BUL	Bozhidar Kraev	36	11	25+10	11	0+1	0	0	0
14	DF	(Bulgaria) BUL	Veselin Minev	27	0	24	0	1	0	2	0
15	MF	(Slovakia) SVK	Roman Procházka	34	8	30	8	2	0	2	0
16	FW	(Bulgaria) BUL	Atanas Kabov	3	0	1+2	0	0	0	0	0
17	FW	(Nigeria) NGA	Tunde Adeniji	41	9	34+3	7	2	2	0+2	0
18	DF	(Bulgaria) BUL	Anton Ognyanov	15	1	8+7	1	0	0	0	0
20	AM	(Spain) ESP	Antonio Añete	34	5	25+5	5	1+1	0	2	0
21	GK	(Bulgaria) BUL	Bozhidar Mitrev	2	0	1+1	0	0	0	0	0
23	DF	(Sweden) SWE	Simon Sandberg	7	0	2+3	0	2	0	0	0
24	MF	(Bulgaria) BUL	Iliya Yurukov	2	0	0+2	0	0	0	0	0
25	DF	(Bulgaria) BUL	Sasho Aleksandrov	38	0	34+1	0	1	0	2	0
26	FW	(France) FRA	Amadou Soukouna	9	1	4+5	1	0	0	0	0
27	MF	(France) FRA	Mehdi Bourabia	32	2	21+9	2	1+1	0	0	0
28	DF	(Czech Republic) CZE	David Jablonský	13	2	12+1	2	0	0	0	0
29	GK	(Serbia) SRB	Bojan Jorgačević	24	0	21	0	1	0	2	0
39	DF	(Bulgaria) BUL	Deyan Ivanov	0	0	0	0	0	0	0	0
70	MF	(Bulgaria) BUL	Georgi Kostadinov	24	4	19+1	4	2	0	2	0
75	MF	(Bulgaria) BUL	Aleks Borimirov	5	0	1+4	0	0	0	0	0
89	GK	(Bulgaria) BUL	Nikolay Krastev	15	0	15	0	0	0	0	0
99	FW	(Bulgaria) BUL	Stanislav Ivanov	12	0	3+9	0	0	0	0	0
Players away from the club on loan:
4	DF	(Bulgaria) BUL	Miki Orachev	5	0	1+2	0	1	0	0+1	0
	FW	(Bulgaria) BUL	Iliya Dimitrov	0	0	0	0	0	0	0	0
88	MF	(Bulgaria) BUL	Georgi Yanev	0	0	0	0	0	0	0	0
	DF	(Bulgaria) BUL	Galin Tashev	0	0	0	0	0	0	0	0
Players who left Levski (Sofia) during the season:
2	DF	(Romania) ROU	Srdjan Luchin	12	0	11+1	0	0	0	0	0
9	FW	(Bulgaria) BUL	Iliyan Mitsanski	9	1	0+9	1	0	0	0	0
10	FW	(Bulgaria) BUL	Ventsislav Hristov	6	0	1+3	0	0	0	2	0
10	AM	(Bulgaria) BUL	Galin Ivanov	4	0	1+2	0	1	0	0	0
11	FW	(Peru) PER	Jean Deza	13	1	2+8	0	0+2	1	0+1	0
21	GK	(Bulgaria) BUL	Ivan Čvorović	1	0	0	0	1	0	0	0
44	DF	(Bulgaria) BUL	Viktor Genev	4	0	2+2	0	0	0	0	0
