= Bozhidar Mitrev =

Bulgarian footballer

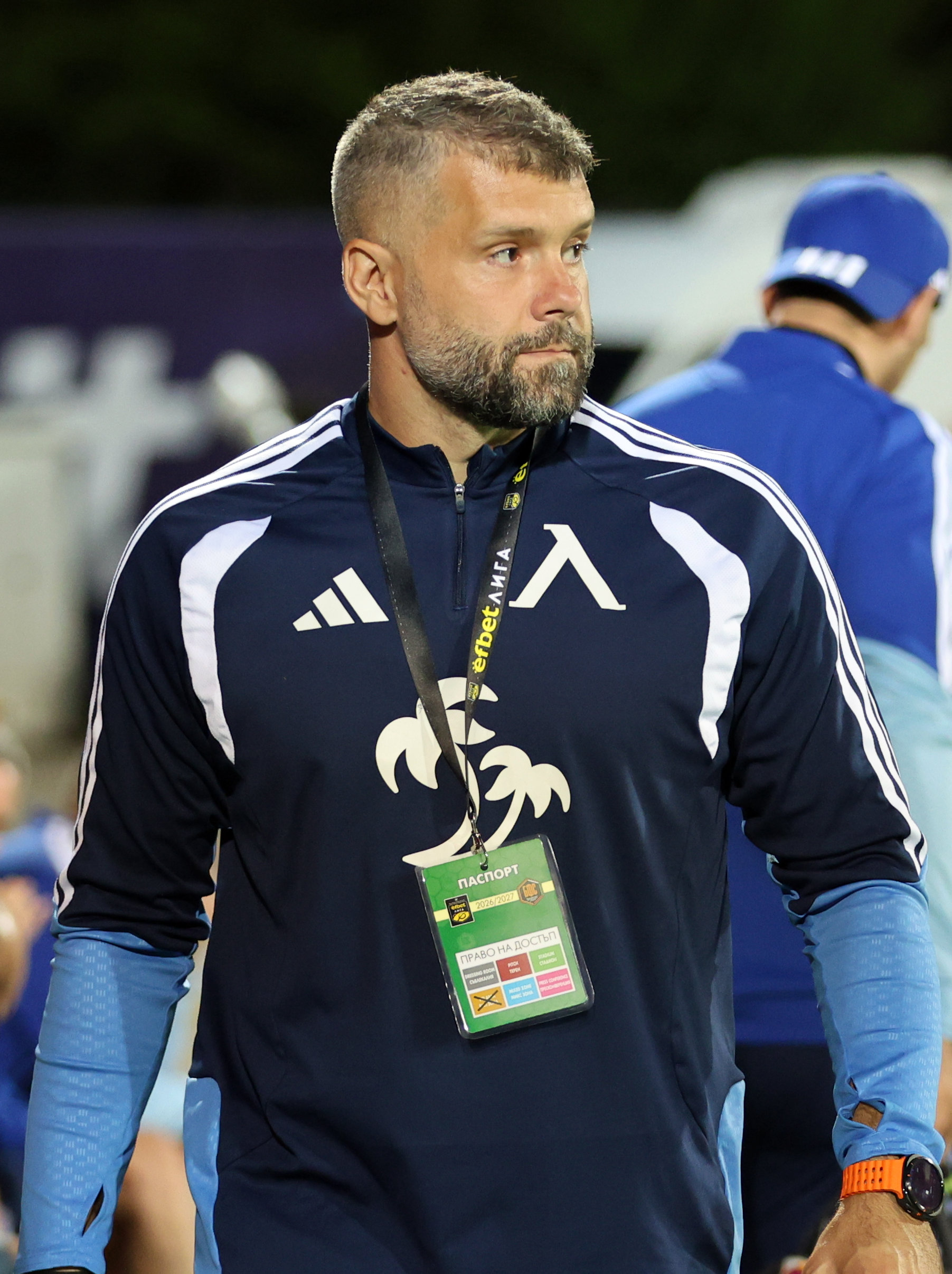

Personal information
- Full name: Bozhidar Konstantinov Mitrev
- Date of birth: 31 March 1987 (age 39)
- Place of birth: Sofia, Bulgaria
- Height: 1.84 m (6 ft 1/2 in)
- Position: Goalkeeper

Team information
- Current team: Levski Sofia (goalkeepers coach)

Youth career
- Levski Sofia

Senior career*
Years	Team	Apps	(Gls)
2006–2012	Levski Sofia	31	(0)
2013–2015	Lokomotiv Sofia	63	(0)
2015–2017	Sheriff Tiraspol	7	(0)
2017–2019	Levski Sofia	39	(0)
2019–2020	Voluntari	15	(0)
2020	Septemvri Sofia	1	(0)
2021	Lokomotiv Sofia	8	(0)
Total		164	(0)

International career^{‡}
2015–2017	Bulgaria	9	(0)

Managerial career
- 2021–2022: Vitosha 13 (goalkeepers coach)
- 2022–2023: Levski Sofia II (goalkeepers coach)
- 2023–2024: Levski Sofia (goalkeepers coach)
- 2025–: Levski Sofia (goalkeepers coach)
- * Club domestic league appearances and goals as of 29 December 2020 ‡ National team caps and goals as of 1 April 2016 (UTC)

Bozhidar Mitrev (Bulgarian: Божидар Митрев; born 31 March 1987 in Sofia) is a Bulgarian retired professional footballer who played as a goalkeeper.

Mitrev began his career at Levski Sofia. In early 2013 he moved to Lokomotiv Sofia, where he made more than 60 league appearances, before moving to Moldovan National Division club Sheriff Tiraspol in 2015. In early 2017 Mitrev re-signed for Levski.

== Career ==
=== Levski Sofia ===
Mitrev came through the youth ranks at Levski Sofia. For 2006–07 season he was promoted to the first squad as third choice behind Georgi Petkov and Nikolay Mihaylov. He made his debut in a 3–0 home loss against Werder Bremen in the group stage of the Champions League on 31 October 2006, replacing Nikolay Mihaylov at half-time. On 4 November, he started for first time, keeping a clean sheet in a 3–0 home league win over Beroe Stara Zagora. On 5 December, Mitrev played in Levski's 2–0 defeat to Chelsea at Stamford Bridge, making several excellent saves, including one reaction save from a Michael Essien header. However, he received criticism from the Chelsea faithful for a bad challenge on Didier Drogba, clearly fouling him. Chelsea were not offered a penalty, however Drogba accepted the apologies of the goalkeeper. Mitrev collected his first A Group title winner's medal at the end of the 2006–07 season, playing 12 matches in all competitions.

On 10 March 2009, Mitrev scored 90-meters goal for the second team of Levski in a game against Vihren Sandanski. On 9 May 2009, he kept a clean sheet in a 2–0 win in the Eternal derby of Bulgarian football against CSKA Sofia. Mitrev finished the season with 7 appearances in the league, as Levski clinched the A Group.

On 17 December 2009, Mitrev played in a 1–0 Europa League away win over Lazio at Stadio Olimpico.

Mitrev left Levski on 1 July 2012 after his contract with the club expired. He spent six seasons of his career with Levski, mainly as a backup. He played 52 competitive games in all competitions.

=== Lokomotiv Sofia ===
After six months without a club, Mitrev joined Lokomotiv Sofia on 28 December 2012. He made his debut in a 2–0 away loss against Lokomotiv Plovdiv on 2 March 2013. Mitrev left the team from the Nadezhda district after the 2014/2015 A PFG season when it was administratively relegated to the V group, as it was unable to obtain a license for professional football due to failing to meet the deadlines to pay for or provide sufficient guarantees regarding its debts.

=== Sheriff Tiraspol ===
In June 2015, Mitrev moved abroad for the first time, joining Moldovan club Sheriff Tiraspol.

=== Return to Levski ===
In March 2017, Mitrev was signed by Levski urgently since the starter Bojan Jorgacevic will be unavailable for the rest of the season due to a shoulder injury and the other two goalkeepers being too young and inexperienced. Mitrev signed for 1,5 years. At the beginning of 2017–18 season, he was appointed as the captain of the team.

=== Voluntari ===
On 27 February 2019, Mitrev signed with Romanian club FC Voluntari until the end of the season with an option for extension.

== International career ==
On 7 February 2015, Mitrev made his first appearance for Bulgaria, in the 0–0 draw with Romania in a non-official friendly match, playing the first 45 minutes. He earned his first cap on 8 June 2015, in the 0:4 loss against Turkey in another exhibition game, being between the sticks for the entire duration of the match. His official debut followed a few days after, keeping a clean sheet the whole match in a 0–1 away win against Malta, for the Euro 2016 qualifiers.

== Career statistics ==
As of 17 July 2021

Club	Season	League			Cup		Europe		Total	
Club	Season	Division	Apps	Goals	Apps	Goals	Apps	Goals	Apps	Goals
Levski Sofia	2006–07	A Group	7	0	3	0	2	0	12	0
Levski Sofia	2007–08	A Group	2	0	2	0	0	0	4	0
Levski Sofia	2008–09	A Group	7	0	1	0	0	0	8	0
Levski Sofia	2009–10	A Group	7	0	2	0	2	0	11	0
Levski Sofia	2010–11	A Group	7	0	1	0	6	0	14	0
Levski Sofia	2011–12	A Group	1	0	2	0	0	0	3	0
Levski Sofia	Total		31	0	11	0	10	0	52	0
Lokomotiv Sofia	2012–13	A Group	11	0	4	0	–		15	0
Lokomotiv Sofia	2013–14	A Group	20	0	7	0	–		27	0
Lokomotiv Sofia	2014–15	A Group	32	0	1	0	–		33	0
Lokomotiv Sofia	Total		63	0	12	0	0	0	75	0
Sheriff Tiraspol	2015–16	Moldovan National Division	3	0	1	0	2	0	6	0
Sheriff Tiraspol	2016–17	Moldovan National Division	4	0	0	0	2	0	6	0
Sheriff Tiraspol	Total		7	0	1	0	4	0	12	0
Levski Sofia	2016–17	First League	2	0	0	0	0	0	2	0
Levski Sofia	2017–18	First League	32	0	6	0	4	0	42	0
Levski Sofia	2018–19	First League	5	0	1	0	2	0	8	0
Levski Sofia	Total		39	0	7	0	6	0	52	0
Voluntari	2018–19	Liga I	6	0	0	0	–		6	0
Voluntari	2019–20	Liga I	8	0	2	0	–		10	0
Voluntari	Total		14	0	2	0	0	0	16	0
Septemvri	2020–21	Second League	1	0	1	0	–		2	0
Lokomotiv Sofia	2020–21	Second League	8	0	0	0	–		8	0
Career totals			163	0	34	0	20	0	217	0

== Honours ==
Levski Sofia

- A Group (2): 2006–07, 2008–09
- Bulgarian Cup: 2006–07
- Bulgarian Supercup (2): 2007, 2009

Sheriff Tiraspol

- Moldovan National Division: 2015–16
- Moldovan Super Cup: 2016

Individual

Best goalkeeper in the Bulgarian First League - 2017.
