= Aleks Borimirov =

Bulgarian footballer

Alex Borimirov
Personal information
- Full name: Alex Daniel Borimirov
- Date of birth: 13 May 1998 (age 28)
- Place of birth: Munich, Germany
- Height: 1.80 m (5 ft 11 in)
- Position: Left winger

Youth career
- Levski Sofia

Senior career*
| Years | Team | Apps | (Gls) |
| 2016–2019 | Levski Sofia | 6 | (0) |
| 2018 | → Lokomotiv Sofia (loan) | 2 | (0) |
| 2019 | → Slavia Sofia (loan) | 1 | (0) |

International career
| 2015 | Bulgaria U17 | 5 | (0) |
- * Club domestic league appearances and goals as of 24 May 2019

Alex Daniel Borimirov (Bulgarian: Алекс Боримиров; born 13 May 1998) is a Bulgarian footballer who plays as a left winger. He is the son of former football player Daniel Borimirov who has played for Levski Sofia and TSV 1860 Munich. Born in Germany, he was a youth international footballer for Bulgaria.

== Career ==
Alex Borimirov has started playing football at the young age of 8 years at the youth academy of football club PFC Levski Sofia.

Borimirov made his first team debut in a 4–0 First league with a home win over Vereya on 28 August 2016, coming on as a substitute for Añete.

== Career statistics ==
=== Club ===
As of 20 January 2018

| Club performance | | | League | | Cup | | Continental | | Other | | Total | |
| Club | League | Season | Apps | Goals | Apps | Goals | Apps | Goals | Apps | Goals | Apps | Goals |
| Bulgaria | | | League | | Bulgarian Cup | | Europe | | Other (Note: Includes Bulgarian Supercup matches.) | | Total | |
|---|---|---|---|---|---|---|---|---|---|---|---|---|
| Levski Sofia | First League | 2016–17 | 5 | 0 | 0 | 0 | – | | – | | 5 | 0 |
| Levski Sofia | First League | 2017–18 | 1 | 0 | 1 | 0 | 3 | 0 | – | | 5 | 0 |
| Lokomotiv Sofia (loan) | Second League | 2017–18 | 0 | 0 | 0 | 0 | – | | – | | 0 | 0 |
| Career statistics | | | 6 | 0 | 1 | 0 | 3 | 0 | 0 | 0 | 10 | 0 |
