= Ousmane Baldé (footballer) =

Guinean footballer

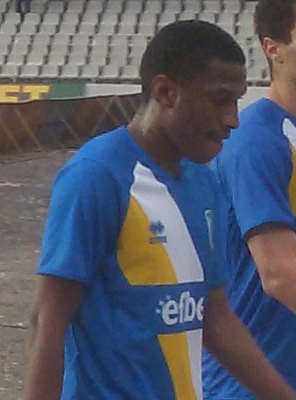

Personal information
- Date of birth: 31 December 1989 (age 36)
- Place of birth: Conakry, Guinea
- Height: 1.80 m (5 ft 11 in)
- Position: Defensive midfielder

Senior career*
Years	Team	Apps	(Gls)
2010–2012	PSG II	57	(4)
2012–2013	Getafe B	23	(3)
2013–2014	Fréjus	7	(0)
2014–2015	Tours II	11	(1)
2015–2016	Olhanense	29	(1)
2016–2018	Vereya	32	(2)
2019–2020	Tours	6	(1)
2020–2023	Tarbes Pyrénées		
2023–2024	Käerjéng	24	(2)

International career^{‡}
2017	Guinea	7	(0)
- * Club domestic league appearances and goals as of 1 June 2024 ‡ National team caps and goals as of 26 January 2018

Ousmane Baldé (born 31 December 1989) is a Guinean international footballer who plays as a midfielder.

== Career ==
In July 2015, Baldé signed for Portuguese second-highest division club Olhanense. He finished the season with 29 appearances and one goal, scoring for a 2–0 home win against Braga B on 21 November 2015.

After 2 years with Vereya, he moved to Tours FC in January 2019.

== International career ==
In March 2017, Baldé was called up to the Guinea national football team for the first time ahead of a friendlies against Gabon and against Cameroon. He made his debut on 24 March in the 2–2 draw against Gabon at the Stade Océane in Le Havre, France, playing the full 90 minutes.
