= Mehdi Bourabia =

Moroccan footballer (born 1991)

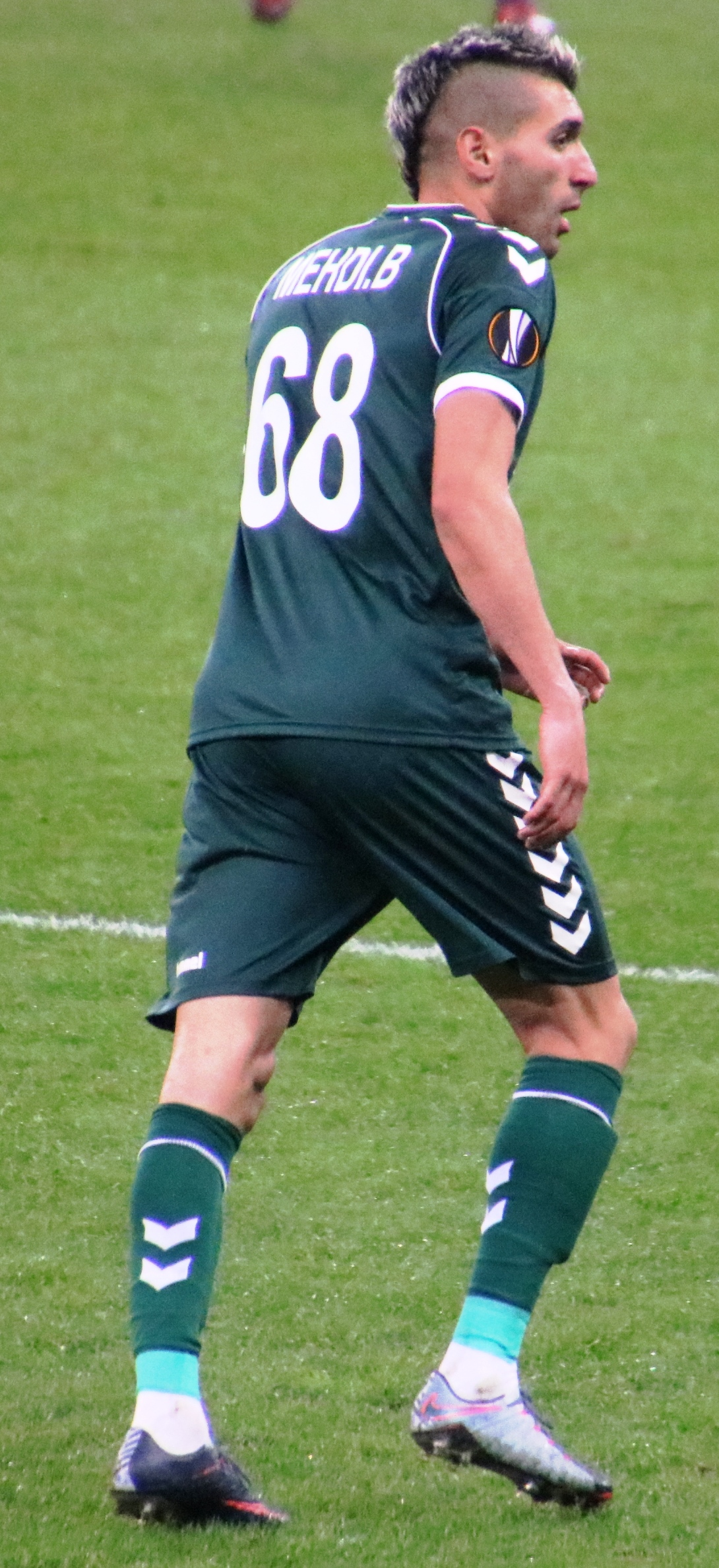
- Bourabia with Konyaspor in 2017

Personal information
- Full name: Mehdi Bourabia
- Date of birth: 7 August 1991 (age 35)
- Place of birth: Dijon, France
- Height: 1.83 m (6 ft 0 in)
- Position: Midfielder

Youth career
- Dijon

Senior career*
| Years | Team | Apps | (Gls) |
| 2009–2010 | Grenoble B | 28 | (3) |
| 2009–2011 | Grenoble | 11 | (1) |
| 2013–2014 | Lille B | 18 | (2) |
| 2015 | Lokomotiv Plovdiv | 11 | (1) |
| 2015 | Cherno More | 19 | (3) |
| 2016–2017 | Levski Sofia | 40 | (2) |
| 2017–2018 | Konyaspor | 30 | (1) |
| 2018–2022 | Sassuolo | 64 | (3) |
| 2021–2022 | → Spezia (loan) | 8 | (1) |
| 2022–2023 | Spezia | 38 | (1) |
| 2023–2024 | Frosinone | 10 | (0) |
| 2024–2025 | Kayserispor | 43 | (4) |

International career^{‡}
| 2018– | Morocco | 8 | (0) |
- * Club domestic league appearances and goals as of 16 June 2025 ‡ National team caps and goals as of 10 October 2018

Mehdi Bourabia (born 7 August 1991) is a professional footballer who plays as a midfielder. Born in France, he plays for the Morocco national team.

== Early life ==
Bourabia was born in Dijon, Côte-d'Or. He is Moroccan by descent.

== Club career ==
He started his career with Grenoble Foot 38 and made his professional debut for the club on 7 November 2009 in a Ligue 1 game against Monaco.

In June 2015, Bourabia signed a two-year contract with Cherno More Varna. On 12 August, he scored the only goal in a 1–0 victory over Ludogorets Razgrad in the Bulgarian Supercup.

On 11 January 2016, Bourabia signed with Levski Sofia on a three-year deal. On 22 June 2017, he was sold to Turkish club Konyaspor for a fee around €500 000.

On 17 July 2018, Bourabia signed with Sassuolo for a fee around €2 million.

On 30 August 2021, Bourabia joined Spezia on a season-long loan with an obligation to buy.

On 1 September 2023, Bourabia moved to Frosinone on a one-year deal.

== International career ==
Bourabia debuted for the Morocco nation team in a 2–2 2019 Africa Cup of Nations qualification draw against Comoros on 16 October 2018.

== Career statistics ==
=== Club ===
As of match played 3 May 2023

Appearances and goals by club, season and competition
| Club | Season | League | | | National cup | | Continental | | Other | | Total | |
| Club | Season | Division | Apps | Goals | Apps | Goals | Apps | Goals | Apps | Goals | Apps | Goals |
|---|---|---|---|---|---|---|---|---|---|---|---|---|
| Grenoble B | 2009–10 | National 2 | 28 | 3 | – | | – | | – | | 28 | 3 |
| Grenoble | 2009–10 | Ligue 1 | 2 | 0 | 0 | 0 | – | | – | | 2 | 0 |
| Grenoble | 2010–11 | Ligue 2 | 9 | 1 | 0 | 0 | – | | 1 (Note: Appearance in Coupe de la Ligue) | 0 | 10 | 1 |
| Grenoble | Total | | 11 | 1 | 0 | 0 | 0 | 0 | 1 | 0 | 12 | 1 |
| Lille B | 2013–14 | National 2 | 18 | 2 | – | | – | | – | | 18 | 2 |
| Lokomotiv Plovdiv | 2014–15 | First League | 11 | 1 | 4 | 1 | – | | – | | 15 | 2 |
| Cherno More | 2015–16 | First League | 19 | 3 | 0 | 0 | 2 | 0 | 1 (Note: Appearance in Bulgarian Supercup) | 1 | 22 | 4 |
| Levski Sofia | 2015–16 | First League | 10 | 0 | 0 | 0 | – | | – | | 10 | 0 |
| Levski Sofia | 2016–17 | First League | 30 | 2 | 2 | 0 | 0 | 0 | – | | 32 | 2 |
| Levski Sofia | Total | | 40 | 2 | 2 | 0 | 0 | 0 | – | | 42 | 2 |
| Konyaspor | 2017–18 | Süper Lig | 30 | 1 | 2 | 0 | 6 (Note: Appearances in UEFA Europa League) | 1 | 1 (Note: Appearance in Turkish Super Cup) | 0 | 39 | 2 |
| Sassuolo | 2018–19 | Serie A | 32 | 1 | 2 | 0 | – | | – | | 34 | 1 |
| Sassuolo | 2019–20 | Serie A | 17 | 1 | 2 | 1 | – | | – | | 19 | 2 |
| Sassuolo | 2020–21 | Serie A | 15 | 1 | 0 | 0 | – | | – | | 15 | 1 |
| Sassuolo | Total | | 64 | 3 | 4 | 1 | – | | – | | 68 | 4 |
| Spezia (loan) | 2021–22 | Serie A | 8 | 1 | 1 | 0 | – | | – | | 9 | 1 |
| Spezia | 2022–23 | Serie A | 32 | 1 | 1 | 0 | – | | – | | 33 | 1 |
| Spezia | Total | | 40 | 2 | 2 | 0 | – | | – | | 42 | 2 |
| Career total | | | 261 | 18 | 14 | 2 | 8 | 1 | 3 | 1 | 284 | 22 |

== Honours ==
Cherno More

- Bulgarian Supercup: 2015

Konyaspor

- Turkish Super Cup: 2017
