= Tomislav Papazov =

Bulgarian footballer

Personal information
- Full name: Tomislav Ivanov Papazov
- Date of birth: 24 August 2001 (age 25)
- Place of birth: Pazardzhik, Bulgaria
- Height: 1.85 m (6 ft 1 in)
- Position: Centre-back

Team information
- Current team: Birkirkara
- Number: 13

Youth career
- Levski Sofia

Senior career*
Years	Team	Apps	(Gls)
2018–2020	Levski Sofia	3	(0)
2019–2020	→ Hebar (loan)	18	(0)
2020–2022	Hebar	50	(3)
2022–2024	Foggia	18	(0)
2023	→ Badalona Futur (loan)	0	(0)
2024–2025	Taranto	11	(1)
2025–	Birkirkara	11	(0)

International career^{‡}
2017–2019	Bulgaria U17	5	(0)
2021	Bulgaria U21	3	(0)
- * Club domestic league appearances and goals as of 26 June 2025 ‡ National team caps and goals as of 14 June 2021

Tomislav Ivanov Papazov (Bulgarian: Томислав Папазов; born 24 August 2001) is a Bulgarian footballer who plays as a centre-back for Maltese Premier League club Birkirkara.

== Career ==
In January 2018, Papazov traveled with the first squad for a training camp in Malta.

On 21 April 2018, he was named on the first-team substitutes' bench for the first time against Vereya; he came on for Miloš Cvetković in the 77th minute for his senior debut. Papazov started a first-team match for the first time in the Eternal derby of Bulgarian football against CSKA Sofia on 15 May 2018, playing alongside Aymen Belaïd as a centre back.

On 31 July 2022, Papazov signed a three-year contract with Foggia in Italy.

On 28 August 2024, Papazov moved to Taranto.

== Career statistics ==
=== Club ===
As of 30 May 2019

Club performance			League		Cup		Continental		Other		Total	
Club	League	Season	Apps	Goals	Apps	Goals	Apps	Goals	Apps	Goals	Apps	Goals
Bulgaria			League		Bulgarian Cup		Europe		Other (Note: Includes Bulgarian Supercup matches.)		Total	
Levski Sofia	First League	2017–18	2	0	0	0	–		–		2	0
Levski Sofia	First League	2018–19	1	0	0	0	0	0	–		1	0
Levski Sofia	Total		3	0	0	0	0	0	0	0	3	0
Career statistics			3	0	0	0	0	0	0	0	3	0
