= Nikolay Krastev (footballer, born 1996) =

Bulgarian footballer (born 1996)

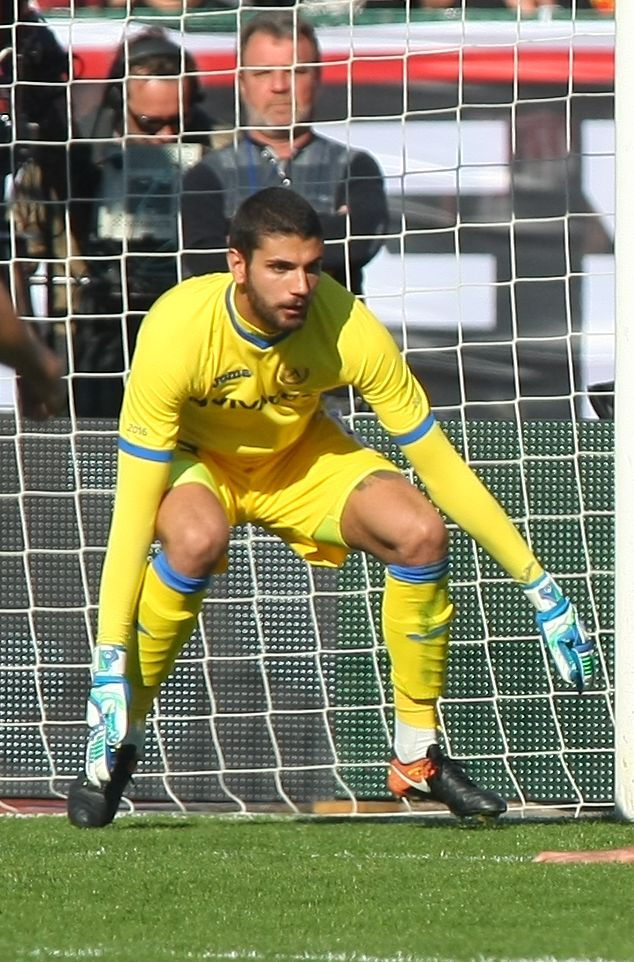

Personal information
- Full name: Nikolay Lachezarov Krastev
- Date of birth: 6 December 1996 (age 29)
- Place of birth: Dupnitsa, Bulgaria
- Height: 1.98 m (6 ft 6 in)
- Position: Goalkeeper

Team information
- Current team: Septemvri Sofia
- Number: 21

Youth career
- Levski Sofia

Senior career*
Years	Team	Apps	(Gls)
2015–2019	Levski Sofia	19	(0)
2016	→ Lokomotiv Mezdra (loan)	7	(0)
2016	→ Nesebar (loan)	5	(0)
2017	→ Botev Vratsa (loan)	8	(0)
2018	→ Botev Vratsa (loan)	2	(0)
2019	West Bromwich Albion	0	(0)
2020	Vitosha Bistritsa	6	(0)
2020–2021	Levski Sofia	1	(0)
2021	Botev Vratsa	0	(0)
2022–2025	Slavia Sofia	38	(0)
2026–	Septemvri Sofia	4	(0)

International career
2012–2013	Bulgaria U17	3	(0)
2017–2018	Bulgaria U21	5	(0)
- * Club domestic league appearances and goals as of 26 May 2026

Nikolay Krastev (Bulgarian: Николай Кръстев; born 6 December 1996) is a Bulgarian professional footballer who plays as a goalkeeper for Septemvri Sofia.

== Career ==
Krastev made his professional debut in a 0-2 league loss from Pomorie on 27 February 2016. He made his league debut for Levski against Dunav during the 2016–17 Bulgarian First League, on 28 February 2017. Levski drew 2-2 and Krastev played full 90 minutes on the pitch. 6 days later he became man of the match in the Eternal derby of Bulgarian football against CSKA Sofia, won by Levski with 2–1.

On 4 May 2017 his contract was extended with 3 years, keeping him in the team until 31 July 2020.

In August 2017, Krastev was loaned to Second League club Botev Vratsa. In January 2018, he was called back to Levski's first team. In June 2018, Krastev was loaned again to newly promoted Botev Vratsa. In February 2022, Krastev signed a two-and-a-half-year contract with Slavia Sofia. In January 2026, he put pen to paper on a deal with Septemvri Sofia.

== International career ==
On 17 March 2017 he received his first call up for Bulgaria's U21 team, but on 21 March 2017 he joined Bulgaria's senior team for the match against Netherlands after the injury of Vladislav Stoyanov, during which he remained on the bench.

== Career statistics ==
=== Club ===
As of 12 December 2020

Club performance			League		Cup		Continental		Other		Total	
Club	League	Season	Apps	Goals	Apps	Goals	Apps	Goals	Apps	Goals	Apps	Goals
Bulgaria			League		Bulgarian Cup		Europe		Other (Note: Includes Bulgarian Supercup matches.)		Total	
Levski Sofia	A Group	2014–15	0	0	0	0	–		–		0	0
Levski Sofia	First league	2016–17	15	0	0	0	0	0	–		15	0
Levski Sofia	First league	2017–18	3	0	0	0	0	0	–		3	0
Levski Sofia	First league	2018–19	1	0	1	0	0	0	–		2	0
Levski Sofia	Total		19	0	1	0	0	0	0	0	20	0
Lokomotiv Mezdra (loan)	B Group	2015-16	7	0	0	0	–		–		7	0
Nesebar (loan)	Second League	2016–17	5	0	0	0	–		–		5	0
Botev Vratsa (loan)	Second League	2017–18	8	0	1	0	–		–		9	0
Botev Vratsa (loan)	First League	2018–19	2	0	0	0	–		–		2	0
Vitosha Bistritsa	First League	2019–20	6	0	0	0	–		–		6	0
Levski Sofia	First League	2020–21	1	0	1	0	–		–		2	0
Career statistics			48	0	3	0	0	0	0	0	51	0
