= Anton Kostadinov =

Bulgarian footballer

Personal information
- Full name: Anton Lyubchov Kostadinov
- Date of birth: 24 June 1982 (age 44)
- Place of birth: Blagoevgrad, Bulgaria
- Height: 1.68 m (5 ft 6 in)
- Position: Midfielder

Senior career*
Years	Team	Apps	(Gls)
2000–2002	Pirin Blagoevgrad		
2002–2003	Levski Sofia	9	(0)
2004	Makedonska slava	13	(0)
2004–2007	Belasitsa Petrich	71	(1)
2007–2008	Lokomotiv Mezdra	13	(0)
2008–2009	Spartak Varna	27	(1)
2010	Vihren Sandanski	10	(0)
2010–2011	Pirin Blagoevgrad	22	(0)
2011–2012	Svetkavitsa	18	(0)
2012–2014	Montana	32	(0)
2014–2019	Pirin Blagoevgrad	119	(1)
2019–2020	Spartak Varna	10	(0)
2020	Pirin Razlog		
2020–2021	Belasitsa Petrich		
2021–2022	Pirin Blagoevgrad II		
- * Club domestic league appearances and goals

Anton Kostadinov (Bulgarian: Антон Костадинов; born 24 June 1982) is a Bulgarian former professional footballer who played as a midfielder.

== Honours ==
Levski Sofia

- Bulgarian Cup: 2002–03
