= Francis Narh =

Ghanaian footballer (born 1994)

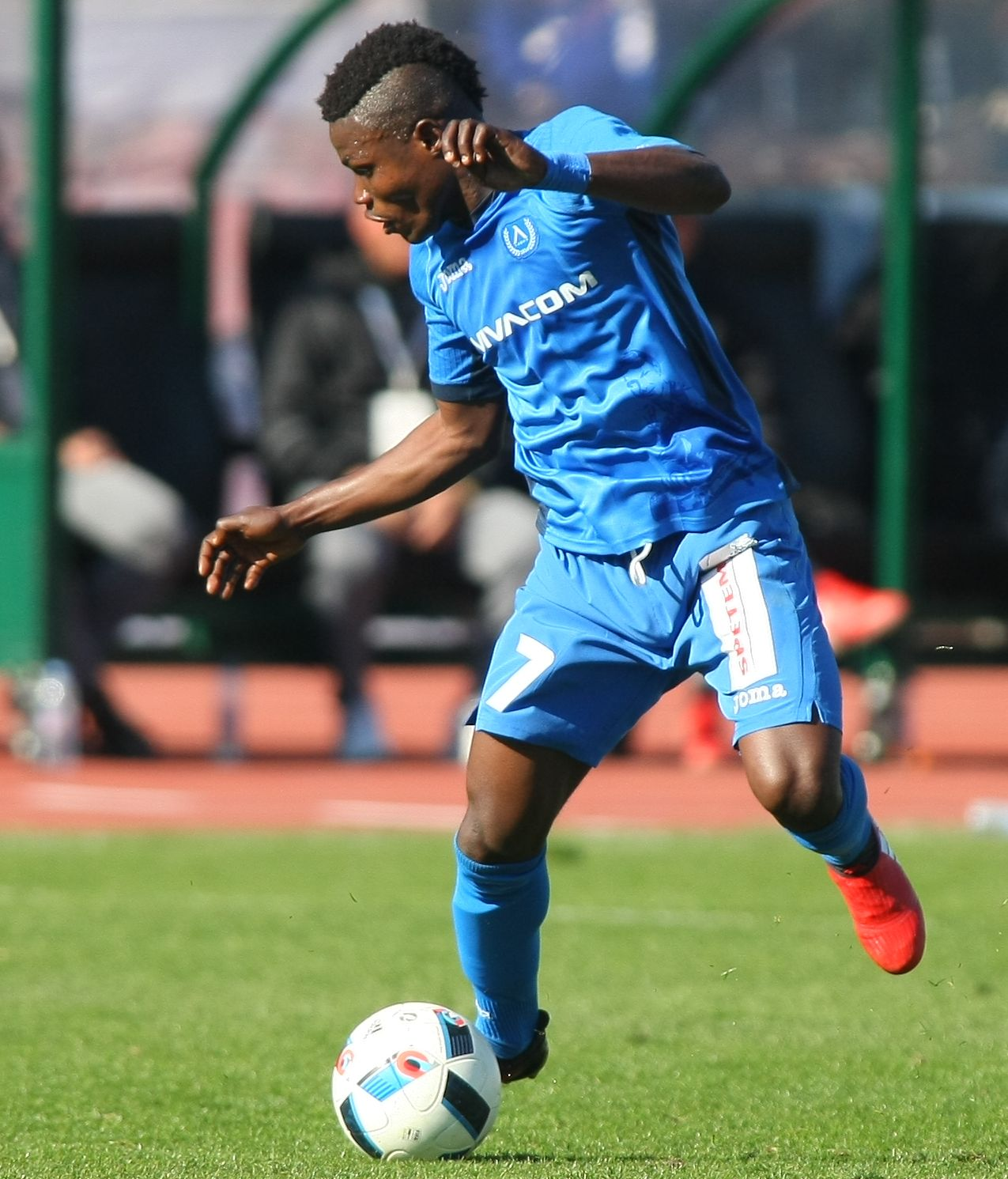

Personal information
- Full name: Francis Narh
- Date of birth: 18 April 1994 (age 32)
- Place of birth: Accra, Ghana
- Height: 1.70 m (5 ft 7 in)
- Positions: Winger; forward

Team information
- Current team: Kattaqorgon

Senior career*
Years	Team	Apps	(Gls)
2010–2013	Tema Youth	67	(43)
2013	→ Club Africain (loan)	6	(0)
2014–2016	Baník Ostrava	46	(7)
2016–2017	Levski Sofia	54	(4)
2018	Doxa Katokopias	14	(2)
2018	Karabükspor	0	(0)
2019–2021	Slavia Mozyr	74	(17)
2022	Bunyodkor	24	(2)
2023–2024	Dinamo Samarqand	42	(3)
2025	Khorazm	10	(0)
2026–	Kattaqorgon	0	(0)

International career^{‡}
2013	Ghana U20	9	(0)
- * Club domestic league appearances and goals as of 19 March 2026 ‡ National team caps and goals as of 17 September 2013

Francis Narh (born 18 April 1994) is a Ghanaian professional footballer who plays as a winger for Uzbekistan Pro League club Kattaqorgon.

== Club career ==
=== Baník Ostrava ===
In early 2014 Narh signed for the Czech team Baník Ostrava. He made his debut for the team on 22 March 2014, coming on as a substitute in the 90 minute against Sparta Prague.

=== Levski Sofia ===
On 9 January 2016, Narh joined Bulgarian side Levski Sofia, signing a three-year deal. He scored his first goal for Levski in a game against PFC Pirin Blagoevgrad. On 21 July 2016, he scored the opener for Levski in the second qualifying round of the Europa League against Maribor, but an eventual 1–1 draw saw Maribor advance to the next round on away goals. On 23 November 2017, he was released from the club due to poor sport condition and systematically non-serious attitude towards the training process.

=== Karabükspor ===
On 4 August 2018, Narh joined Turkish side Karabükspor as a free agent after being released by Cypriot club Doxa Katokopias, signing a one-year contract.

=== Slavia Mozyr ===
Narh signed a contract with Belarusian club Slavia Mozyr in the summer of 2019.

=== Bunyodkor ===
On 15 March 2022, it was announced that Narh had signed a short-term deal with Uzbek side Bunyodkor.

=== Dinamo Samarqand ===
On 22 February 2023, Dinamo Samarqand announced the signing of Narh to a one-year contract.

== International career ==
In June 2013, Narh was named in manager Sellas Tetteh's 21-man squad for the 2013 FIFA U-20 World Cup. He made his debut on 21 June in the opening group-stage game, a 3–1 loss against France U20.

== Career statistics ==
=== Club ===
As of 25 November 2017

Club performance			League		Cup		Continental		Other		Total	
Club	League	Season	Apps	Goals	Apps	Goals	Apps	Goals	Apps	Goals	Apps	Goals
Czech Republic			League		Czech Cup		Europe		Other		Total	
Baník Ostrava	Synot liga	2013–14	8	2	0	0	–		–		8	2
Baník Ostrava	Synot liga	2014–15	23	2	2	0	–		–		25	2
Baník Ostrava	Synot liga	2015–16	15	3	0	0	–		–		15	3
Baník Ostrava	Total		46	7	2	0	0	0	0	0	48	7
Bulgaria			League		Bulgarian Cup		Europe		Other (Note: Includes Bulgarian Supercup matches.)		Total	
Levski Sofia	First League	2015–16	15	1	0	0	–		–		15	1
Levski Sofia	First League	2016–17	37	3	2	0	2	1	–		41	4
Levski Sofia	First League	2017–18	2	0	0	0	4	0	–		6	0
Levski Sofia	Total		54	4	2	0	6	1	0	0	62	5
Career statistics			100	11	4	0	6	1	0	0	110	12
