= Hristofor Hubchev =

Bulgarian footballer

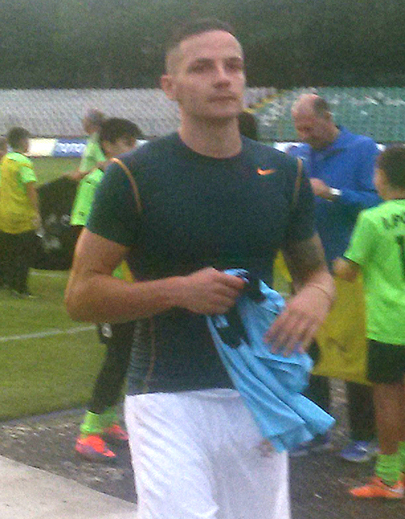

Personal information
- Full name: Hristofor Hristoforov Hubchev
- Date of birth: 24 November 1995 (age 30)
- Place of birth: Madrid, Spain
- Height: 1.81 m (5 ft 11 1/2 in)
- Positions: Left-back; centre-back

Team information
- Current team: Spartak Varna

Youth career
- –2013: Levski Sofia
- 2013–2014: Bonner SC

Senior career*
Years	Team	Apps	(Gls)
2014–2016	Montana	36	(0)
2016	Beroe	0	(0)
2017–2018	Dunav Ruse	30	(0)
2018–2019	AE Larissa	18	(0)
2019–2021	Etar	26	(0)
2021	Levski Sofia	4	(1)
2021–2023	Pirin Blagoevgrad	34	(2)
2023–	Spartak Varna	0	(0)

International career
–2013	Bulgaria U17	9	(0)
2013–2014	Bulgaria U19	11	(0)
2014–2016	Bulgaria U21	2	(0)
- * Club domestic league appearances and goals as of 5 May 2023

Hristofor Hubchev (Bulgarian: Христофор Хубчев; born 24 November 1995) is a Bulgarian footballer who plays as a defender for Spartak Varna. He is the nephew of Petar Hubchev.

== Career ==
On 22 June 2014, Hubchev joined Montana.

On 18 June 2016, Hubchev joined Beroe Stara Zagora, but was released on 2 December 2016 without a single appearance in a league game. In June 2023, he signed a two-year contract with Spartak Varna.

== Career statistics ==
As of match played 16 December 2018

Appearances and goals by club, season and competition
Club	Season	League			Cup		Continental		Other		Total	
Club	Season	Division	Apps	Goals	Apps	Goals	Apps	Goals	Apps	Goals	Apps	Goals
Montana	2014–15	B Group	14	0	0	0	—		—		14	0
Montana	2015–16	A Group	22	0	4	0	—		—		26	0
Montana	Total		36	0	4	0	0	0	0	0	40	0
Beroe	2016–17	First League	0	0	1	0	1 (Note: Appearances in the Europa League)	0	—		2	0
Dunav	2016–17	First League	15	0	1	0	—		—		16	0
Dunav	2017–18	First League	15	0	1	0	2	0	—		18	0
Dunav	Total		30	0	2	0	2	0	0	0	34	0
AEL	2017–18	Super League Greece	6	0	3	0	—		—		9	0
AEL	2018–19	Super League Greece	12	0	2	0	—		—		14	0
AEL	Total		18	0	5	0	0	0	0	0	23	0
Career statistics			84	0	12	0	3	0	0	0	99	0
