= Anton Ognyanov =

Bulgarian footballer (born 1988)

Personal information
- Full name: Anton Kunchev Ognyanov
- Date of birth: 30 June 1988 (age 38)
- Place of birth: Stara Zagora, Bulgaria
- Height: 1.82 m (6 ft 0 in)
- Positions: Left back; winger

Team information
- Current team: Svilengrad 2022 (player-manager)

Youth career
- 1998–2006: Beroe

Senior career*
Years	Team	Apps	(Gls)
2006–2008	Beroe	10	(0)
2008–2009	Naftex	20	(1)
2009	Minyor Radnevo	17	(1)
2010	Beroe	2	(0)
2010	Botev Plovdiv	13	(0)
2011	Svilengrad	10	(1)
2011–2013	Lyubimets	68	(18)
2014	Levski Sofia	4	(0)
2015	Beroe	8	(0)
2016	Dunav Ruse	28	(4)
2017	Levski Sofia	15	(1)
2017	Cherno More	8	(1)
2018	Vereya	26	(3)
2019	Botev Vratsa	8	(1)
2019	Botev Galabovo	11	(2)
2020–2021	Etar	19	(0)
2021–2022	Krumovgrad		
2022–	Svilengrad 2022		

Managerial career
- 2023–: Svilengrad 2022 (player-manager)
- * Club domestic league appearances and goals as of 22:58, 29 August 2021 (UTC)

Anton Ognyanov (Bulgarian: Антон Огнянов; born 30 June 1988) is a Bulgarian professional footballer who plays for Bulgarian Svilengrad 2022, where he also serves as manager. Known for his versatility, he is adept on the left wing, having played as a fullback as well as a winger.

== Career ==
=== Lyubimets ===
In June 2011, Ognyanov joined Lyubimets. During a spell of nearly three years at the club, he scored 18 goals in total. In the promotion campaign of 2012–13 he scored 14 goals to fire Lyubimets into the A Group. In 2012, he was also appointed captain of the team due to his contributions and retained that position until his departure from the club in January 2014, totaling 68 matches for Lyubimets.

=== Levski Sofia ===
Ognyanov signed with Levski Sofia on 11 January 2014 on a two-and-a-half-year deal. He scored on his unofficial debut, a 5-3 friendly win against Chernomorets Burgas. However, Ognyanov sustained an unfortunate injury (rupture of his ligament of the ankle and a sprained left leg) in a friendly match against Viktoria Plzen which ruled him out until the end of the season, postponing his official Levski Sofia debut and preventing him from accepting a likely call-up to the national team for a friendly match against Belarus. On 27 July 2014, following his recovery from the injury, Ognyanov made his first official appearance for Levski Sofia after coming on a second-half substitute in the 0–2 loss against CSKA Sofia in The Eternal Derby.

=== Beroe ===
In January 2015, Ognyanov rejoined his hometown club Beroe.

=== Dunav Ruse ===
On 19 January 2016 he was released from Beroe, subsequently signing with the B Group team Dunav Ruse.

=== Cherno More ===
On 12 October 2017, Ognyanov signed with Cherno More following a successful trial period. On 21 October, he scored in his debut, after coming on as a late substitute for Stefan Stanchev in a 3–0 away win against Lokomotiv Plovdiv. On 12 December 2017, Ognyanov's contract was terminated by mutual consent.

=== Etar ===
Ognyanov joined Etar in January 2020.

=== Levski Krumovgrad ===
In June 2021, Ognyanov joined Third League club Levski Krumovgrad.
