= Galin Tashev =

Bulgarian footballer

Personal information
- Full name: Galin Stoyanov Tashev
- Date of birth: 2 February 1997 (age 29)
- Place of birth: Nova Zagora, Bulgaria
- Position: Defender

Team information
- Current team: Litex Lovech
- Number: 14

Youth career
- Zagorets
- Levski Sofia

Senior career*
Years	Team	Apps	(Gls)
2014–2018	Levski Sofia	3	(0)
2016	→ Nesebar (loan)	0	(0)
2016–2017	→ Etar (loan)	14	(0)
2017–2018	→ Lokomotiv Sofia (loan)	15	(0)
2018–2020	Montana	34	(0)
2020	Neftochimic	10	(0)
2021–2023	Sportist Svoge	55	(2)
2023–	Litex Lovech	16	(0)

International career
2014	Bulgaria U17	3	(0)
- * Club domestic league appearances and goals as of 5 June 2023

Galin Tashev (Bulgarian: Галин Ташев; born 2 February 1997) is a Bulgarian footballer who currently plays as a defender for Litex Lovech.

== Career ==
Tashev hasn't made his league debut for the club yet but already took part in 3 matches for the Bulgarian Cup during the 2014–15 campaign. The first one being against Spartak Varna. The match was won by Levski with 7–1. Tashev started amongst the first 11 in another Cup game against Montana and got on as a substitute against Haskovo.

In June 2017, Tashev was loaned to Lokomotiv Sofia.

In June 2018, Tashev signed with Second League club Montana.
