= Tunde Adeniji =

Nigerian footballer (born 1995)

Personal information
- Full name: Babatunde Temitope Adeniji
- Date of birth: 17 September 1995 (age 31)
- Place of birth: Akure, Nigeria
- Height: 1.85 m (6 ft 1 in)
- Position: Forward

Team information
- Current team: Al-Tadamon
- Number: 17

Youth career
- 2010–2012: Rising Stars

Senior career*
Years	Team	Apps	(Gls)
2012–2013	Rising Stars	16	(7)
2013–2016	Sunshine Stars	71	(42)
2016–2017	Levski Sofia	49	(8)
2018	Atyrau	30	(8)
2019	Al-Nasr		
2019–2020	Debrecen	29	(9)
2020	Kunshan FC	15	(1)
2021	Al-Fayha	17	(11)
2021–2022	Al-Adalah	37	(9)
2023–	Al-Tadamon		

International career^{‡}
2014–2015	Nigeria U-20	3	(2)
2015–	Nigeria	4	(0)
- * Club domestic league appearances and goals as of 7 November 2020 ‡ National team caps and goals as of 22 August 2016

Tunde Adeniji (born 17 September 1995), nicknamed The Tiger, is a Nigerian professional footballer who plays as a forward for Al-Tadamon.

== Career ==
=== Rising Stars ===
From an early age, Tunde was scouted by officials of the Ondo State Football Agency while playing on the dusty fields of Okitipupa. He was signed to the Agency's developmental side, Rising Stars Academy where he played for two seasons and helped his side to acquire promotion for the Premier League as he emerged as the top scorer of the team. He featured in 16 games and scored 7 goals.

=== Sunshine Stars ===
Adeniji joined Sunshine Stars at the start of the 2013–14 season. He was expected to understudy the club's main striker, Dele Olorundare in his debut season in the topflight but he later scored thirteen (13) league goals to emerge as the club's top scorer at the end of the season.

In the 2014–15 season he became an all-round player scoring and creating chances for his teammates. He ended the season with sixteen (16) goals and 7 assists.

=== Levski Sofia ===
On 17 February 2016, after long negotiations, Adeniji moved abroad to Europe to sign a 3-year contract with Bulgarian side Levski Sofia at a reported transfer fee of €180,000. His first goal for the club came in a game against Lokomotiv Plovdiv on 7 August 2016.

=== Atyrau ===
On 21 January 2018, Adeniji signed for FC Atyrau.

=== Al-Nasr SC ===
Adeniji took the trip to Kuwait and signed with Al-Nasr SC on 31 January 2019 until June 2020.

=== Debrecen ===
In July 2019, Adeniji became part of the ranks of Hungarian club Debrecen.

=== Kunshan F.C. ===
On 6 September 2020, Adeniji joined China League One side Kunshan FC.

=== Al-Fayha ===
On 7 February 2021, Adeniji joined Prince Mohammad bin Salman League side Al-Fayha.

=== Al-Adalah ===
On 27 July 2021, Adeniji joined Prince Mohammad bin Salman League side Al-Adalah.

=== Al-Tadamon ===
On 8 January 2023, Adeniji joined Kuwaiti club Al-Tadamon.

== Career statistics ==
=== Club ===
As of 25 February 2017

Club performance			League		Cup		Continental		Other		Total	
Club	League	Season	Apps	Goals	Apps	Goals	Apps	Goals	Apps	Goals	Apps	Goals
Bulgaria			League		Bulgarian Cup		Europe		Other (Note: Includes Bulgarian Supercup matches.)		Total	
Levski Sofia	A Group	2015–16	12	0	0	0	—		—		12	0
Levski Sofia	First League	2016–17	22	7	2	2	2	0	—		25	9
Levski Sofia	Total		33	6	2	2	2	0	0	0	37	9
Career statistics			33	6	2	2	2	0	0	0	37	9

=== International ===
Nigeria national team
Year	Apps	Goals
2015	4	0
Total	4	0

== International career ==
Adeniji received his first call-up for the Nigeria U20 team in 2014 and made a few appearances and scored goals. The following year he received his first call-up for the senior team.

== Honours ==
=== Club ===
A Group Runner-up: 2015-2016

=== Individual ===
First League Player of the Month: August 2016
