= Dimitar Pirgov =

Bulgarian footballer

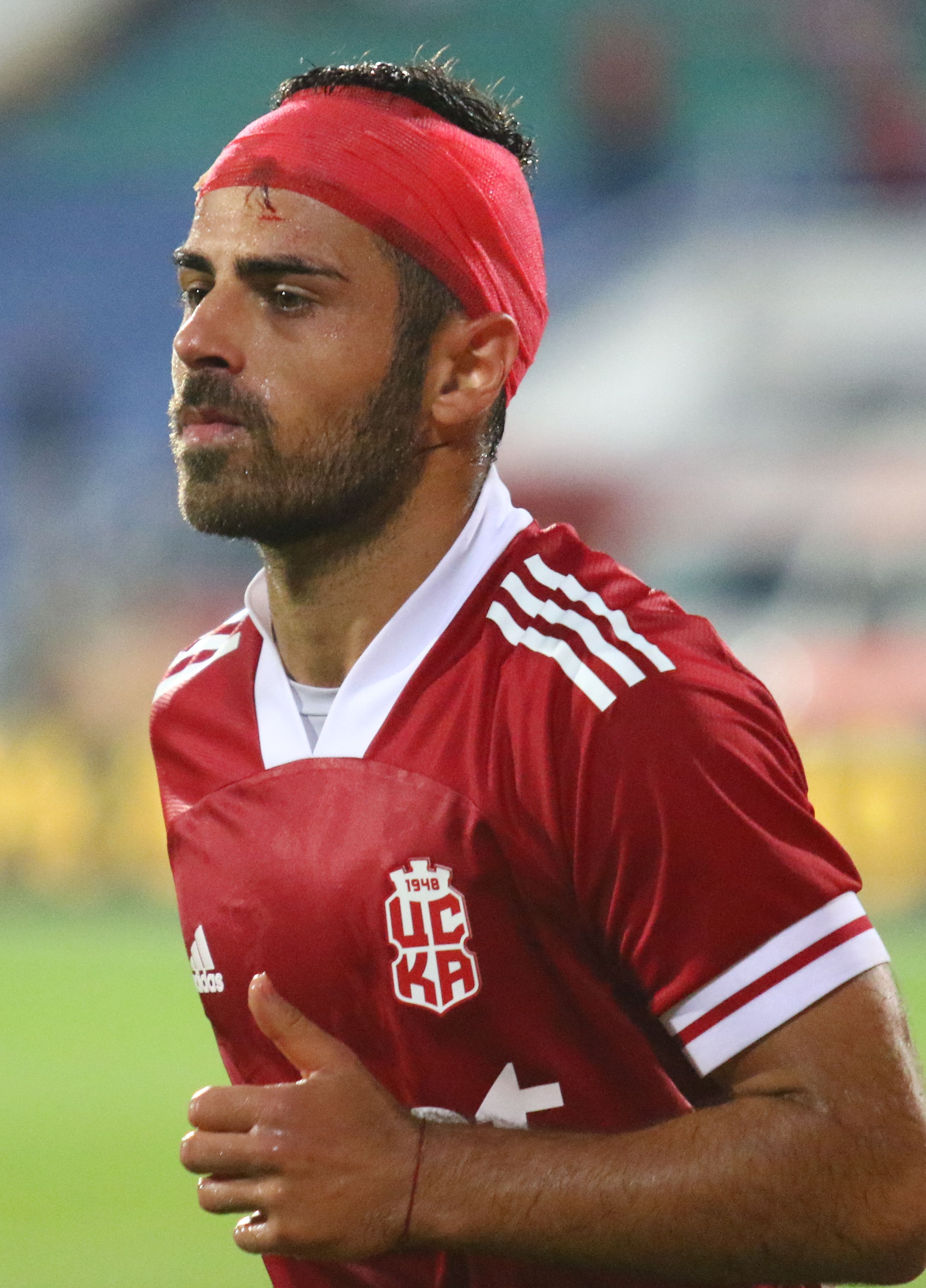
- Pirgov in 2020

Personal information
- Full name: Dimitar Emilov Pirgov
- Date of birth: 26 October 1989 (age 37)
- Place of birth: Gotse Delchev, Bulgaria
- Height: 1.81 m (5 ft 11 in)
- Position: Defender

Team information
- Current team: Krumovgrad
- Number: 3

Senior career*
| Years | Team | Apps | (Gls) |
| 2009–2011 | Chavdar Etropole | 52 | (5) |
| 2012–2013 | Pirin Gotse Delchev | 62 | (4) |
| 2014–2016 | Slavia Sofia | 54 | (4) |
| 2016–2018 | Levski Sofia | 36 | (2) |
| 2018–2020 | Botev Plovdiv | 56 | (0) |
| 2020–2022 | CSKA 1948 | 43 | (0) |
| 2020–2022 | CSKA 1948 II | 5 | (0) |
| 2022 | Beroe | 16 | (0) |
| 2023 | Krumovgrad | 15 | (1) |
| 2023–2026 | Dobrudzha | 90 | (9) |
| 2026– | Krumovgrad | 12 | (0) |

International career
| 2016 | Bulgaria | 1 | (0) |
- * Club domestic league appearances and goals as of 30 October 2026

Dimitar Emilov Pirgov (Bulgarian: Димитър Емилов Пиргов; born 26 October 1989) is a Bulgarian professional footballer who plays as a defender for Krumovgrad. He is the younger brother of Ilko Pirgov.

== Club career ==
Pirgov began his football career with Chavdar Etropole. On 12 February 2012, he signed for Pirin Gotse Delchev. He made his league debut against Slivnishki geroi on 14 March, playing the full 90 minutes. Pirgov finished the season with 10 appearances, as Pirin clinched promotion to the A PFG. He was acquired by Slavia Sofia in late January 2014. After playing for Levski Sofia for two years, Pirgov signed a contract with Botev Plovdiv on 23 January 2018. Pirgov joined CSKA 1948 in May 2020.

== International career ==
Pirgov was called up to the senior Bulgaria squad by Ivaylo Petev for a 2018 FIFA World Cup qualifier against Luxembourg in September 2016. Pirgov earned his first cap on 7 October under Petev's successor Petar Houbchev, playing the full 90 minutes in the 1:4 away loss against France in another qualification match for the 2018 World Cup.

== Career statistics ==
=== Club ===
As of 16 February 2019

Appearances and goals by club, season and competition
| Club | Season | League | | Bulgarian cup | | Europe | | Total | |
| Club | Season | Apps | Goals | Apps | Goals | Apps | Goals | Apps | Goals |
|---|---|---|---|---|---|---|---|---|---|
| Chavdar Etropole | 2009–10 | 11 | 2 | 3 | 0 | – | | 14 | 2 |
| Chavdar Etropole | 2010–11 | 28 | 3 | 2 | 1 | – | | 30 | 4 |
| Chavdar Etropole | 2011–12 | 13 | 0 | 2 | 0 | – | | 15 | 0 |
| Chavdar Etropole | Total | 52 | 5 | 7 | 1 | 0 | 0 | 59 | 6 |
| Pirin Gotse Delchev | 2011–12 | 10 | 0 | 0 | 0 | – | | 10 | 0 |
| Pirin Gotse Delchev | 2012–13 | 30 | 2 | 4 | 0 | – | | 34 | 2 |
| Pirin Gotse Delchev | 2013–14 | 22 | 2 | 2 | 0 | – | | 24 | 2 |
| Pirin Gotse Delchev | Total | 62 | 4 | 6 | 0 | 0 | 0 | 68 | 4 |
| Slavia Sofia | 2013–14 | 4 | 1 | 0 | 0 | – | | 4 | 1 |
| Slavia Sofia | 2014–15 | 20 | 2 | 1 | 0 | – | | 21 | 2 |
| Slavia Sofia | 2015–16 | 30 | 1 | 0 | 0 | – | | 30 | 1 |
| Slavia Sofia | Total | 54 | 4 | 1 | 0 | 0 | 0 | 55 | 4 |
| Levski Sofia | 2016–17 | 28 | 2 | 1 | 2 | 2 | 0 | 31 | 4 |
| Levski Sofia | 2017–18 | 9 | 0 | 2 | 0 | 4 | 0 | 15 | 0 |
| Levski Sofia | Total | 37 | 2 | 3 | 2 | 6 | 0 | 46 | 4 |
| Botev Plovdiv | 2018–19 | 11 | 0 | 0 | 0 | 0 | 0 | 11 | 0 |
| Botev Plovdiv | 2018–19 | 10 | 0 | 2 | 0 | 0 | 0 | 12 | 0 |
| Botev Plovdiv | Total | 21 | 0 | 2 | 0 | 0 | 0 | 23 | 0 |
| Career total | | 226 | 15 | 19 | 3 | 6 | 0 | 251 | 18 |
