= Añete =

Spanish footballer (born 1985)

Personal information
- Full name: Antonio Salas Quinta
- Date of birth: 1 October 1985 (age 41)
- Place of birth: Seville, Spain
- Height: 1.76 m (5 ft 9 in)
- Position: Forward

Youth career
- 2004–2006: Real Sociedad

Senior career*
| Years | Team | Apps | (Gls) |
| 2006–2008 | Real Sociedad B | | |
| 2008–2009 | Coria | | |
| 2009–2010 | San Roque | 35 | (9) |
| 2010–2011 | Real Jaén | 23 | (4) |
| 2011–2012 | Ceuta | 45 | (6) |
| 2012–2013 | Olympiacos Volos | 39 | (9) |
| 2013–2014 | Niki Volos | 38 | (21) |
| 2014–2015 | Levski Sofia | 28 | (14) |
| 2015–2016 | Neftchi Baku | 26 | (3) |
| 2016–2017 | Levski Sofia | 30 | (5) |
| 2017–2018 | Apollon Smyrnis | 17 | (1) |
| Total | | 281 | (72) |
- * Club domestic league appearances and goals

Antonio Salas Quinta (born 1 October 1985), simply known as Añete, is a Spanish former professional footballer who played as a forward.

== Career ==
=== Spain ===
A graduate of Real Sociedad youth academy Añete had a brief stint with the B team between 2006 and 2008 before playing for Coria in Tercera División. Then he tried his luck with Segunda División clubs San Roque, Jaén and Ceuta.

=== Greece ===
In 2012, Añete made his first stint outside Spain, with Olympiacos Volos of Football League (second tier of Greek football). He scored 9 goals in 39 matches during a 2012–13 season.

For the following campaign, Añete joined Niki Volos. On 29 September 2013, he marked his debut with a goal in a 2–0 away win over Doxa Drama. On 1 June 2014, Añete scored a hat-trick to give Niki Volos a 4–0 victory over Iraklis. He finished the season as the league's top scorer with 21 goals and 14 assists, helping his team to gain promotion to the Super League Greece.

=== Bulgaria ===
On 23 July 2014, Añete signed a one-year contract with Bulgarian side Levski Sofia. He made his debut four days later, in a 2–0 loss against CSKA Sofia in the Eternal derby of Bulgarian football. On 14 September, Añete scored his first goal with fantastic lob, netting the second in a 2–0 home win over Slavia Sofia. In the last minute of the game, he chipped the ball and lobbed it over the advancing Slavia's goalkeeper. On 6 December, during a 1–0 away loss against Cherno More, for a challenge on opponent Añete received his first red card in Bulgaria.

On 17 April 2015, Añete scored a hat-trick in a league match against Lokomotiv Plovdiv and was voted Man of the Match by the fans. On 29 April Antonio scored a crucial last-minute goal to secure a 1–0 victory in the Bulgarian Cup Semifinal against Ludogorets. The final result of the game was 1–0 and Levski got through the final. The Spaniard also opened the scoring in the 2015 Bulgarian Cup final, but Cherno More netted an equalizer in the 92nd minute and won the match after extra time.

He was considered a key player by the Levski Sofia management (with the potential to have the team built around him). He scored 14 goals in 28 matches and became the top-scorer of A group in Bulgaria for season 2014/2015. However, in June 2015, Añete confirmed that he will not be extending his contract with the "bluemen".

After playing one season in Neftchi Baku, on 24 June 2016 Añete returned to Levski Sofia. He left the club in May 2017 when his contract ended.

=== Return to Greece ===
On 23 July 2017, Apollon Smyrnis announced the signing of Añete on a one-year contract, ahead of the 2017–18 season.
