= 2015–16 PFC Levski Sofia season =

Levski Sofia
2015–16 season
- Chairman: Ivo Tonev
- Manager: Stoycho Stoev (until 13 May 2016); Ljupko Petrović (since 14 May 2016)
- Stadium: Georgi Asparuhov
- A Group: 2nd
- Bulgarian Cup: Quarter-finals
- Top goalscorer: League: Ventsislav Hristov (8); All: Ventsislav Hristov (8)
- Highest home attendance: 12,500 v. Ludogorets Razgrad (23 April 2016)
- Lowest home attendance: 550 v. Pirin Blagoevgrad (13 March 2016)
- Average home league attendance: 3,178
- Biggest win: 5–1 v. Cherno More (H)
- Biggest defeat: 0–3 v. Litex (A)
Home colours	Away colours	Third colours

The 2015–16 season was Levski Sofia's 95th season in the First League. This article shows player statistics and all matches (official and friendly) that the club has played during the season.

== Transfers ==
=== In ===
No.	Pos.	Nat.	Name	Age	EU	Moving from	Type	Transfer window	Ends	Transfer fee	Source
2	DF	(Romania)	Srdjan Luchin	29	EU	(Romania) Poli Timișoara	Free transfer	Winter	2017	Free	sportal.bg
5	DF	(Bulgaria)	Aleksandar Aleksandrov	29	EU	(Bulgaria) Ludogorets Razgrad	Free transfer	Winter	2017	Free	btvnovinite.bg
7	FW	(North Macedonia)	Denis Mahmudov	25	EU	(Netherlands) PEC Zwolle	Free transfer	Summer	2017	Free	bnr.bg
7	MF	(Ghana)	Francis Narh	21	Non-EU	(Czech Republic) Baník Ostrava	Transfer	Winter	2019	€0.2M	dnevnik.bg
8	MF	(Curaçao)	Jeremy de Nooijer	23	EU	(Netherlands) Sparta Rotterdam	Free transfer	Summer	2017	Free	bnr.bg
9	FW	(Bulgaria)	Atanas Kurdov	26	EU	(Kazakhstan) Astana	Free transfer	Summer	2016	Free	fakti.bg
11	FW	(France)	Oumar Diaby	25	EU	(Slovakia) Košice	Free transfer	Summer	2017	Free	trud.bg
11	FW	(Cameroon)	Justin Mengolo	22	Non-EU	(Romania) Universitatea Cluj	Free transfer	Winter	2018	Free	
17	FW	(Nigeria)	Tunde Adeniji	20	Non-EU	(Nigeria) Sunshine Stars	Transfer	Winter	2019	€0.18M	sportal.bg
20	DF	(Bulgaria)	Zhivko Milanov	30	EU	(Russia) Tom Tomsk	Free transfer	Summer	2015	Free	trud.bg
24	GK	(Bulgaria)	Aleksandar Lyubenov	20	EU	(Bulgaria) Septemvri Simitli	Loan return	Summer			
27	MF	(Morocco)	Mehdi Bourabia	24	EU	(Bulgaria) Cherno More	Free transfer	Winter	2019	Free	levski.bg
30	DF	(Austria)	Maximilian Karner	25	EU	(Austria) SV Grödig	Free transfer	Summer	2017	Free	btvnovinite.bg
55	DF	(Bulgaria)	Yordan Miliev	28	EU	(North Macedonia) Shkëndija	Free transfer	Winter	2016	Free	trud.bg
70	MF	(Bulgaria)	Georgi Kostadinov	24	EU	(Bulgaria) Beroe	Free transfer	Summer	2017	Free	winner.bg
91	FW	(Bulgaria)	Ventsislav Hristov	27	EU	(Croatia) Rijeka	Free transfer	Winter	2018	Free	btvnovinite.bg
99	MF	(France)	Lynel Kitambala	26	EU	(Belgium) Charleroi	Free transfer	Summer	2017	Free	dnes.bg
	FW	(France)	Santy Ngom	22	EU	(France) Paris Saint-Germain B	Free transfer	Winter	2016	Free	sportal.bg

Total spending: €0.38M ▼

=== Out ===
No.	Pos.	Nat.	Name	Age	EU	Moving to	Type	Transfer window	Transfer fee	Source
3	DF	(Tunisia)	Aymen Belaïd	27	EU	(England) Rotherham United	Released	Winter	Free	themillers.co.uk
5	DF	(Bulgaria)	Borislav Stoychev	28	EU	(Greece) Atromitos	Released	Summer	Free	gol.bg
7	MF	(Norway)	Liban Abdi	26	EU	(Turkey) Çaykur Rizespor	End of loan	Summer		
7	FW	(North Macedonia)	Denis Mahmudov	26	EU	(Armenia) Banants	Released	Winter	Free	novsport.com
8	MF	(Bulgaria)	Georgi Sarmov	31	EU	(Romania) Poli Timișoara	End of contract	Summer	Free	
9	FW	(Poland)	Łukasz Gikiewicz	27	EU	(Saudi Arabia) Al-Wehda	Released	Summer	Free	trud.bg
9	FW	(Bulgaria)	Atanas Kurdov	27	EU		Released	Winter	Free	trud.bg
11	MF	(Netherlands)	Luís Pedro	25	EU	(Romania) Târgu Mureș	Released	Summer	Free	eurocom.bg
11	FW	(France)	Oumar Diaby	25	EU	(Scotland) Hamilton Academical	Released	Winter	Free	novsport.com
17	FW	(Bulgaria)	Valeri Domovchiyski	28	EU	(Greece) Levadiakos	Released	Summer	Free	trud.bg
20	FW	(Spain)	Añete	29	EU	(Azerbaijan) Neftchi Baku	End of contract	Summer	Free	trafficnews.bg
20	DF	(Bulgaria)	Zhivko Milanov	31	EU	(Cyprus) APOEL	End of contract	Winter	Free	pik.bg
22	MF	(Bulgaria)	Vladislav Misyak	20	EU	(Bulgaria) Neftochimic	Released	Winter	Free	sportal.bg
23	GK	(Bulgaria)	Plamen Iliev	23	EU	(Romania) Botoșani	Released	Summer	Free	standartnews.com
31	DF	(Romania)	Emil Ninu	28	EU	(Cyprus) AEK Larnaca	Released	Summer	Free	pik.bg
45	MF	(Bulgaria)	Vladimir Gadzhev	28	EU	(England) Coventry City	End of contract	Winter	Free	novsport.com
55	DF	(Bulgaria)	Yordan Miliev	28	EU		End of contract	Winter	Free	novsport.com
77	MF	(Bulgaria)	Stefan Velev	26	EU	(Bulgaria) Lokomotiv Plovdiv	Released	Summer	Free	standartnews.com
99	MF	(France)	Lynel Kitambala	27	EU	(Belgium) Union SG	Released	Winter	Free	novsport.com
	FW	(France)	Santy Ngom	22	EU		Released	Winter	Free	pik.bg

Total income: €0

Net income: -€0.38M ▼

=== Loans out ===
No.	Pos.	Nat.	Name	Age	EU	Moving to	Type	Transfer window	Transfer fee	Source
	GK	(Bulgaria)	Nikolay Krastev	19	EU	(Bulgaria) Lokomotiv Mezdra	Loan	Winter	—	
	FW	(Bulgaria)	Iliya Dimitrov	19	EU	(Bulgaria) Neftochimic	Loan	Winter	—	

== Squad ==
Updated on 28 May 2016.

No.	Name	Nationality	Position(s)	Age	EU	Ends	Signed from	Transfer fee	Notes
Goalkeepers
1	Dimitar Sheytanov	Bulgaria	GK	16	EU		Youth system	W/S	
24	Aleksandar Lyubenov	Bulgaria	GK	20	EU	2016	Youth system	W/S	
29	Bojan Jorgačević	Serbia	GK	33	EU	2018	(Turkey) Erciyesspor	Free	Second nationality: Belgium
Defenders
2	Srdjan Luchin	Romania	CB	29	EU	2017	(Romania) Poli Timişoara	Free	
4	Miki Orachev	Bulgaria	LB/LW	19	EU	2018	Youth system	W/S	
5	Aleksandar Aleksandrov	Bulgaria	CB	29	EU	2017	(Bulgaria) Ludogorets Razgrad	Free	
14	Veselin Minev	Bulgaria	LB	34	EU	2017	(Bulgaria) Botev Plovdiv	Free	Originally from Youth system
25	Sasho Aleksandrov	Bulgaria	RB	28	EU	2016	(Bulgaria) Cherno More	Free	
30	Maximilian Karner	Austria	CB	25	EU	2017	(Austria) Grödig	Free	
39	Deyan Ivanov	Bulgaria	CB	19	EU		Youth system	W/S	
Midfielders
8	Jeremy de Nooijer	Curaçao	DM/CM	23	EU	2017	(Netherlands) Sparta Rotterdam	Free	Second nationality: Netherlands
10	Miguel Bedoya	Spain	AM	29	EU	2016	(Spain) Numancia	Free	
12	Bozhidar Kraev	Bulgaria	AM/RW	17	EU	2018	Youth system	W/S	
15	Roman Procházka	Slovakia	DM	26	EU	2018	(Slovakia) Spartak Trnava	€0.12M	
18	Borislav Tsonev	Bulgaria	CM	20	EU	2016	Youth system	W/S	
21	Radoslav Tsonev	Bulgaria	CM	20	EU	2016	Youth system	W/S	
27	Mehdi Bourabia	Morocco	CM	23	EU	2019	(Bulgaria) Cherno More	€0.1M	
70	Georgi Kostadinov	Bulgaria	DM	24	EU	2017	(Bulgaria) Beroe	Free	
88	Georgi Yanev	Bulgaria	CM	17	EU	2017	Youth system	W/S	
Strikers
7	Francis Narh	Ghana	RW	22	Non-EU	2019	(Czech Republic) Baník Ostrava	€0.2M	
11	Justin Mengolo	Cameroon	RW	22	Non-EU	2018	(Romania) Universitatea Cluj	Free	
17	Tunde Adeniji	Nigeria	CF	19	Non-EU	2019	(Nigeria) Sunshine Stars	€0.18M	
91	Ventsislav Hristov	Bulgaria	CF/AM	26	EU	2016	(Croatia) Rijeka	Free	
99	Stanislav Ivanov	Bulgaria	CF/AM	16	EU		Youth system	W/S	

== Performance overview ==
Competition	First match	Last match	Starting round	Final position	Record							
Competition	First match	Last match	Starting round	Final position	Pld	W	D	L	GF	GA	GD	Win %
A Group	18 July 2015	28 May 2016	Matchday 1	2nd	32	16	8	8	36	18	+18	50.00
Bulgarian Cup	24 September 2015	8 December 2015	Round of 32	Quarter-finals	3	1	1	1	3	4	−1	33.33
Total					35	17	9	9	39	22	+17	48.57

Source: Fixtures

== Fixtures ==
Win Draw Loss Upcoming fixture

=== Friendlies ===
==== Summer ====
24 June 2015	Levski Sofia	4–2	Septemvri Simitli	Samokov
15:00 EEST	Kraev 9'; Kurdov 30'; Misyak 44'; Ninu 62'	Report	Katsimerski 21'; Orachev 80' (o.g.)	Stadium: Iskar

1 July 2015	Levski Sofia	2–1	Montana	Samokov
15:00 EEST	Kurdov 45' (pen.); Dimitrov 81'	Report	Lazarov 72'	Stadium: Iskar

4 July 2015	Levski Sofia (Bulgaria)	1–2	(Russia) Volga	Sofia
17:00 EEST	Konstantinou 55'	Report	Orachev 9' (o.g.); Petrov 90' (pen.)	Stadium: Georgi Asparuhov

8 July 2015	Levski Sofia	0–2	Pirin Blagoevgrad	Samokov
16:30 EEST		Report	Toshev 3'; Hadzhiivanov 71'	Stadium: Iskar

11 July 2015	Levski Sofia	1–0	Lokomotiv Plovdiv	Sofia
16:00 EEST	de Nooijer 3'	Report		Stadium: Georgi Asparuhov

==== Mid-season ====
10 October 2015	Levski Sofia (Bulgaria)	2–2	(Sweden) Djurgården	Sofia
15:30 EET	Kurdov 49'; Dimitrov 90'	Report	Walker 8'; Stenman 85'	Stadium: Vasil Levski National Stadium

16 April 2016	Levski Sofia	3–0	Rilski Sportist	Sofia
14:00 EEST	Adeniji 19', 48'; Kraev 37'	Report		Stadium: Georgi Asparuhov

==== Winter ====
16 January 2016	Svilengrad	0–6	Levski Sofia	Svilengrad
11:00 EET		Report	Kraev 6', 8'; Bedoya 13', 17' de Nooijer 39'; Dimitrov 57'	Stadium: Kolodruma

23 January 2016	Levski Sofia (Bulgaria)	2–0	(Kazakhstan) Tobol	Antalya, Turkey
17:00 TRT	Bedoya 12'; S. Ivanov 62'	Report		Stadium: Mardan Sports Complex

26 January 2016	Levski Sofia (Bulgaria)	3–2	(Ukraine) Oleksandriya	Belek, Turkey
17:00 TRT	Kostadinov 4'; Luchin 11'; Bedoya 81'	Report	Kozak 7'; Leonov 84'	Stadium: Susesi Sports Complex

29 January 2016	Levski Sofia (Bulgaria)	2–1	(Romania) Poli Timișoara	Belek, Turkey
15:00 TRT	Narh 30'; Luchin 33'	Report	Everon 26'	Stadium: Titanic Sports Complex

3 February 2016	Levski Sofia (Bulgaria)	0–0	(Romania) Viitorul Constanța	Antalya, Turkey
17:00 TRT		Report		Stadium: Mardan Sports Complex

6 February 2016	Levski Sofia (Bulgaria)	1–0	(Czech Republic) Zbrojovka Brno	Antalya, Turkey
17:00 TRT	Kostadinov 80' (pen.)	Report		Stadium: Mardan Sports Complex

9 February 2016	Levski Sofia (Bulgaria)	1–1	(Slovenia) Domžale	Antalya, Turkey
15:00 TRT	Kostadinov 2'	Report	Lucas 47'	Stadium: Mardan Sports Complex

11 February 2016	Levski Sofia (Bulgaria)	3–0	(Slovakia) Spartak Myjava	Antalya, Turkey
16:30 TRT	Kostadinov 57'; Bedoya 82'; Mengolo 85'	Report		Stadium: Mardan Sports Complex

=== A Group ===
==== League table ====
Pos	Team	Pld	W	D	L	GF	GA	GD	Pts	Qualification or relegation
1	Ludogorets Razgrad (C)	32	21	7	4	55	21	+34	70	Qualification for the Champions League second qualifying round
2	Levski Sofia	32	16	8	8	36	18	+18	56	Qualification for the Europa League second qualifying round
3	Beroe	32	14	11	7	37	27	+10	53	Qualification for the Europa League first qualifying round
4	Slavia Sofia	32	14	7	11	36	29	+7	49 (Note: Slavia Sofia ahead of Lokomotiv Plovdiv on head-to-head record; Slavia Sofia–Lokomotiv Plovdiv 3–0, Lokomotiv Plovdiv–Slavia Sofia 2–0, Slavia Sofia–Lokomotiv Plovdiv 3–0, Lokomotiv Plovdiv–Slavia Sofia 3–1.)	Qualification for the Europa League first qualifying round
5	Lokomotiv Plovdiv	32	15	4	13	40	45	−5	49	

Source: Bulgarian Football Association, Soccerway
Rules for classification: 1) Points; 2) Head-to-head points; 3) Head-to-head goal difference; 4) Head-to-head goals scored; 5) Head-to-head away goals scored (only if two teams); 6) Goal difference; 7) Goals scored; 8) Fairplay ranking; 9) Draw.
(C) Champions

==== Results summary ====
Overall								Home						Away					
Pld	W	D	L	GF	GA	GD	Pts	W	D	L	GF	GA	GD	W	D	L	GF	GA	GD
32	16	8	8	36	18	+18	56	10	4	2	24	7	+17	6	4	6	12	11	+1

Last updated: 15 November 2016.
Source: See Results

==== Results by round ====
Round	1	2	3	4	5	6	7	8	9	10	11	12	13	14	15	16	17	18	19	20	21	22	23	24	25	26	27	28	29	30	31	32	33	34	35	36
Ground	A	H	A	A	H	A	H	A	H	H	A	H	H	A	H	A	H	A	A	H	A	A	H	A	H	A	H	H	A	H	H	A	H	A	H	A
Result	D	-	L	W	W	L	D	W	W	W	-	D	W	W	W	L	W	L	D	-	L	W	D	D	W	D	W	W	-	D	W	W	L	W	L	L
Position	5	6	8	5	5	5	4	3	3	3	1	1	1	1	1	1	1	1	2	2	2	2	2	2	2	2	2	2	2	2	2	2	2	2	2	2

Source: See Results
A = Away; H = Home; W = Win; D = Draw; L = Loss

==== Matches ====
18 July 2015 1	Botev Plovdiv	1–1	Levski Sofia	Plovdiv
18:30 EEST	Zlatkov (yellow card) 39'; Baltanov (yellow card) 55'; Ognyanov (penalty missed) 61'; Genov 69'; Marin (yellow card) 77'	Report	Kostadinov 11'; Kraev (yellow card) 28'; B. Tsonev (yellow card) 60'; Procházka (yellow card) 65'; S. Aleksandrov (yellow card) 68'	Stadium: Botev 1912 Football Complex; Attendance: 3,200; Referee: Nikolay Yordanov

25 July 2015 2	Levski Sofia	2–2	Litex Lovech	Sofia
21:00 EEST	Kraev 5'; Minev (yellow card) 28' (yellow-red card) 71'; Belaïd (yellow card) 45'; Procházka 60'	Report	Rafa Pérez 40'; Goranov (yellow card) 45'; Malinov (yellow card) 45' (yellow-red card) 90'; Arsénio 52'; Boumal (yellow card) 60'	Stadium: Georgi Asparuhov; Attendance: 4,870; Referee: Tasko Taskov
Note: On 22 December 2015, after the expulsion of Litex from A Group, the result of this game was annulled.

1 August 2016 3	Ludogorets Razgrad	2–0	Levski Sofia	Razgrad
21:00 EEST	Dyakov (yellow card) 31'; Cicinho (yellow card) 36'; Lucas Sasha (yellow card) 56'; Marcelinho 61', (yellow card) 84'; Quixadá (yellow card) 81'; Misidjan 86'; Moți (yellow card) 90'	Report	B. Tsonev (yellow card) 18'; Kostadinov (yellow card) 28'; Mahmudov (yellow card) 43'; D. Ivanov (yellow card) 45'; Orachev (yellow card) 50'; Karner (yellow card) 66'; Jorgačević (yellow card) 75'	Stadium: Ludogorets Arena; Attendance: 5,630; Referee: Ivaylo Stoyanov

8 August 2016 4	Cherno More	0–1	Levski Sofia	Varna
17:30 EEST	Bijev (yellow card) 39'; Burkhardt (yellow card) 41'	Report	de Nooijer (yellow card) 20'; B. Tsonev 45+1'; Kraev (yellow card) 75'; Kostadinov (yellow card) 84'; D. Ivanov (yellow card) 90'	Stadium: Ticha; Attendance: 4,320; Referee: Vihren Manev

15 August 2016 5	Levski Sofia	2–0	Montana	Sofia
20:00 EEST	B. Tsonev (yellow card) 32'; Kraev 59', 68'	Report	Minchev (yellow card) 47'; Popov (yellow card) 54'; Pashov (yellow card) 57'; Genchev (yellow card) 61'; Baldzhiyski (yellow card) 77'	Stadium: Georgi Asparuhov; Attendance: 4,300; Referee: Stefan Apostolov

23 August 2015 6	Lokomotiv Plovdiv	1–0	Levski Sofia	Plovdiv
20:00 EEST	Dufau (yellow card) 43'; Karagaren 46'; Tunchev (yellow card) 65'; El Kharroubi (yellow card) 89'; Valchev (yellow card) 90'	report	Karner (yellow card) 35'; Kostadinov (yellow card) 60'; Belaïd (yellow card) 62' (yellow-red card) 90'; Kurdov (yellow card) 83'; Procházka (yellow card) 90'; Kraev (yellow card) 90'	Stadium: Lokomotiv; Attendance: 3,660; Referee: Stanislav Todorov

30 August 2015 7	Levski Sofia	0–0	Pirin Blagoevgrad	Sofia
20:00 EET	de Nooijer (yellow card) 27'; Jorgačević (yellow card) 84'; Minev (yellow card) 87'	Report	Trayanov (yellow card) 33'; Tasev (yellow card) 50'; Bengyuzov (yellow card) 57'; Marquinhos (penalty missed) 85'; Popev (yellow card) 86'; Kostov (yellow card) 90'; Nikolov (yellow card) 90'	Stadium: Georgi Asparuhov; Attendance: 3,310; Referee: Volen Chinkov

13 September 2015 8	Slavia Sofia	0–1	Levski Sofia	Sofia
16:15 EEST	Karabelyov (yellow card) 28'; Martinov (yellow card) 87'	Report	Diaby 8'; Kraev (yellow card) 24'; Kostadinov (yellow card) 40'; Orachev (yellow card) 61' (yellow-red card) 74'; Karner (yellow card) 71'	Stadium: Slavia; Attendance: 3,600; Referee: Tsvetan Krastev

20 September 2015 9	Levski Sofia	2–0	Beroe	Sofia
20:00 EET	Gadzhev 25'; Minev (yellow card) 61'; Kitambala (yellow card) 83'; R. Tsonev (yellow card) 88'; Procházka 89'	Report	Isa (yellow card) 17'; I. Ivanov (yellow card) 60' (yellow-red card) 73'	Stadium: Georgi Asparuhov; Attendance: 4,880; Referee: Stanislav Todorov

28 September 2015 10	Levski Sofia	1–0	Botev Plovdiv	Sofia
20:00 EEST	Kostadinov 58' de Nooijer (yellow card) 90'	Report	Marin (yellow card) 46'; Kifouéti (yellow card) 84'; Varela (yellow card) 88'	Stadium: Georgi Asparuhov; Attendance: 3,670; Referee: Georgi Yordanov

4 October 2015 11	Litex Lovech	1–2	Levski Sofia	Lovech
20:00 EEST	Malinov 33', (yellow card) 85'	Report	Belaïd 30', (yellow card) 52'; Procházka 39'	Stadium: Gradski; Attendance: 5,820; Referee: Tsvetan Krastev
Note: On 22 December 2015, after the expulsion of Litex from A Group, the result of this game was annulled.

18 October 2015 12	Levski Sofia	1–1	Ludogorets Razgrad	Sofia
20:00 EEST	Milanov 39'; Kraev (yellow card) 59'; Procházka (yellow card) 69'	Report	Marcelinho (yellow card) 3'; Keșerü 60'; Dyakov (yellow card) 67'; Borjan (yellow card) 69'	Stadium: Georgi Asparuhov; Attendance: 10,670; Referee: Ivaylo Stoyanov

23 October 2015 13	Levski Sofia	1–0	Cherno More	Sofia
19:45 EEST	Bedoya (yellow card) 41'; Karner 44'; Diaby (yellow card) 50'; Procházka (yellow card) 90'	Report	Bijev (yellow card) 28'; Coureur (yellow card) 36'; Klok (yellow card) 37'; Coulibaly (yellow card) 76'; Sténio (yellow card) 82'	Stadium: Georgi Asparuhov; Attendance: 1,750; Referee: Georgi Yordanov

2 November 2015 14	Montana	0–2	Levski Sofia	Montana
14:30 EET	Pashov (yellow card) 45'	Report	Procházka 45+2' (pen.), (yellow card) 83'; Kraev (yellow card) 55', (goal) 70' de Nooijer (yellow card) 56'	Stadium: Ogosta; Attendance: 2,440; Referee: Tsvetan Krastev

8 November 2015 15	Levski Sofia	1–0	Lokomotiv Plovdiv	Sofia
16:15 EET	Kostadinov (yellow card) 48'; Bedoya 77'; Milanov (yellow card) 90'	Report	Stoyanov (yellow card) 8'; Yanukov (yellow card) 15'; Baldovaliev (yellow card) 31'; Krumov (yellow card) 42'; Trajanov (yellow card) 74'	Stadium: Georgi Asparuhov; Attendance: 2,600; Referee: Nikolay Yordanov

22 November 2015 16	Pirin Blagoevgrad	1–0	Levski Sofia	Blagoevgrad
16:30 EET	Toshev 1'; Sandanski (yellow card) 41'; A. Kostadinov (yellow card) 45'	Report	Karner (yellow card) 52'; Diaby (yellow card) 70'; Mahmudov (yellow card) 90'	Stadium: Hristo Botev; Attendance: 3,380; Referee: Dragomir Draganov

29 November 2015 17	Levski Sofia	2–0	Slavia Sofia	Sofia
17:45 EET	Procházka 16' de Nooijer 41'; Milanov (yellow card) 89'; Miliev (yellow card) 89'	Report	Stoev (yellow card) 43'	Stadium: Georgi Asparuhov; Attendance: 1,850; Referee: Nikola Popov

2 December 2015 18	Beroe	1–0	Levski Sofia	Stara Zagora
17:30 EET	Djoman (yellow card) 31'; Delev 64'; Tom (yellow card) 66'; Kostov (yellow card) 86'; Pirgov (yellow card) 90'; Dinkov (yellow card) after FT'	Report	Karner (yellow card) 33'; Kitambala (yellow card) 51'; Procházka (yellow card) 67'; Gadzhev (yellow card) 84'; Milanov (yellow card) 90'; Belaïd (yellow card) after FT'	Stadium: Beroe; Attendance: 5,230; Referee: Ivaylo Stoyanov

5 December 2015 19	Botev Plovdiv	0–0	Levski Sofia	Plovdiv
14:00 EET	Baltanov (yellow card) 45'	Report	Karner (yellow card) 88'	Stadium: Botev 1912 Football Complex; Attendance: 3,030; Referee: Martin Stoimenov

12 December 2015 20	Levski Sofia	3–0 (w/o)	Litex Lovech	Sofia
21:00 EET	Minev (yellow card) 8'; Jorgačević (yellow card) 17'	Report	Johnsen (red card) 15'; Asprilla 20'; Rafa Pérez (red card) 44'	Stadium: Georgi Asparuhov; Attendance: 3,430; Referee: Georgi Yordanov
Note: In the additional time of the 1st half, the Litex players abandoned the pitch in protest of the referee's decisions. The game was given as forfeit and a 3–0 walkover win for Levski. Later, Litex were expelled from A Group, annulling all of their results, including this walkover win.

21 February 2016 21	Ludogorets Razgrad	2–1	Levski Sofia	Razgrad
15:30 EET	Wanderson 5'; Quixadá (yellow card) 22'; Lucas Sasha 55'; Moți (red card) 71'; Stoyanov (yellow card) 89'; Anicet (yellow card) 90'	Report	Kostadinov (yellow card) 14'; Minev (yellow card) 22'; A. Aleksandrov (yellow card) 41'; Narh (yellow card) 45'; Procházka 81'; S. Aleksandrov (yellow card) 83'; Mengolo (yellow card) 90'	Stadium: Ludogorets Arena; Attendance: 7,500; Referee: Nikola Popov

27 February 2016 22	Cherno More	0–2	Levski Sofia	Varna
13:00 EET	Palankov (yellow card) 8'; Romanov (yellow card) 13'; Georgiev (yellow card) 25'; Stoychev (yellow card) 35'; Iliev (yellow card) 45'; Bacari (yellow card) 69'; Eugénio (yellow card) 71'	Report	S. Aleksandrov (yellow card) 19'; Bedoya (yellow card) 33', (goal) 63'; Kostadinov 53'; Minev (yellow card) 90'	Stadium: Ticha; Attendance: 3,700; Referee: Stanislav Todorov

2 March 2016 23	Levski Sofia	0–0	Montana	Sofia
18:00 EET	Kraev (yellow card) 70'; R. Tsonev (yellow card) 81'	Report	Kokonov (yellow card) 90'; Ivanov (yellow card) 90'	Stadium: Georgi Asparuhov; Attendance: 2,190; Referee: Angel Bayaltsaliev

5 March 2016 24	Lokomotiv Plovdiv	1–1	Levski Sofia	Plovdiv
14:00 EET	Trajanov 17'; Krumov (yellow card) 19'	report	Kraev (yellow card) 22'; Bedoya (yellow card) 35'; Hristov 54'; Narh (yellow card) 57'; R. Tsonev (yellow card) 75'	Stadium: Lokomotiv; Attendance: 3,370; Referee: Tsvetan Krastev

13 March 2016 25	Levski Sofia	3–1	Pirin Blagoevgrad	Sofia
16:15 EET	Narh (yellow card) 10', (goal) 84'; Bedoya 31', (yellow card) 36'; Hristov 45+3'; R. Tsonev (yellow card) 72'; Procházka (yellow card) 90'	Report	Nikolov 11'; A. Kostadinov (yellow card) 22'; Popev (yellow card) 45'; Tasev (yellow card) 52'; Viyachki (yellow card) 58'	Stadium: Georgi Asparuhov; Attendance: 550; Referee: Boyan Slavkov

18 March 2016 26	Slavia Sofia	0–0	Levski Sofia	Sofia
14:00 EET	Yomov (yellow card) 81'; Baldzhiyski (yellow card) 88'; Petkov (yellow card) 90'	Report	Procházka (yellow card) 34'; Luchin (yellow card) 80'	Stadium: Slavia; Attendance: 2,380; Referee: Georgi Kabakov

2 April 2016 27	Levski Sofia	1–0	Beroe	Sofia
20:00 EEST	Bedoya (yellow card) 30'; Hristov 45+4' (pen.); Minev (yellow card) 57'; Bourabia (yellow card) 64' (yellow-red card) 71'	Report	Makendzhiev (yellow card) 45'; Djoman (yellow card) 57'; Penev (yellow card) 63' (yellow-red card) 81'	Stadium: Georgi Asparuhov; Attendance: 0 Referee: Stanislav Todorov
Note: The game was played behind closed doors due to a punishment to Levski by the BFU.

9 April 2016 28	Levski Sofia	3–0	Botev Plovdiv	Sofia
20:00 EEST	Hristov 33'; Procházka 40', 70'; R. Tsonev (yellow card) 64'	Report	Starokin (yellow card) 34'	Stadium: Georgi Asparuhov; Attendance: 2,390; Referee: Nikolay Yordanov

16 April 2016 29	Litex Lovech	–	Levski Sofia	Lovech
				Stadium: Gradski
Note: The game was suspended after the expulsion of Litex from A Group.

23 April 2016 30	Levski Sofia	0–0	Ludogorets Razgrad	Sofia
20:00 EEST	S. Aleksandrov (yellow card) 9'	Report	Natanael (yellow card) 2'; Keșerü (yellow card) 56'; Wanderson (yellow card) 64'; Marcelinho (yellow card) 66'; Moți (yellow card) 73'	Stadium: Georgi Asparuhov; Attendance: 12,500; Referee: Stanislav Todorov

28 April 2016 31	Levski Sofia	5–1	Cherno More	Sofia
19:30 EEST	Kraev 8'; Hristov 34', 68', 74'; Bedoya 86'; Karner (yellow card) 90'	Report	Georgiev 12', (yellow card) 70'; Stoychev (yellow card) 39'; Bacari (yellow card) 90'	Stadium: Georgi Asparuhov; Attendance: 1,940; Referee: Nikola Popov

6 May 2016 32	Montana	0–1	Levski Sofia	Montana
18:00 EEST	Genchev (yellow card) 46'; Todorov (yellow card) 63'; Georgiev (yellow card) 90'	Report	Narh (yellow card) 45'; Karner (yellow card) 48'; Bedoya 51'	Stadium: Ogosta; Attendance: 1,310; Referee: Angel Angelov

10 May 2016 33	Levski Sofia	2–3	Lokomotiv Plovdiv	Sofia
20:30 EEST	Hristov 16', (yellow card) 62'; Bedoya 17'; Kostadinov (yellow card) 90'; Minev (yellow card) 90'	Report	Kiki (yellow card) 32'; Minev 47' (o.g.); Amrioui (yellow card) 58'; Kamburov 65'; Teles (yellow card) 76'; Karagaren 89', (yellow card) 90'	Stadium: Georgi Asparuhov; Attendance: 1,420; Referee: Ivaylo Stoyanov

15 May 2016 34	Pirin Blagoevgrad	0–1	Levski Sofia	Blagoevgrad
20:30 EEST	Marquinhos (yellow card) 53'	Report	S. Aleksandrov (yellow card) 11'; Hristov (yellow card) 45'; A. Aleksandrov 45+4', (yellow card) 80' (yellow-red card) 90'	Stadium: Hristo Botev; Attendance: 1,900; Referee: Vihren Manev

22 May 2016 35	Levski Sofia	0–1	Slavia Sofia	Sofia
18:00 EEST	Luchin (yellow card) 73'; Procházka (yellow card) 75'	Report	Stoev (yellow card) 29'; Pirgov (yellow card) 76'; Omar (yellow card) 83'; Baldzhiyski (yellow card) 90', (goal) 90+1'	Stadium: Georgi Asparuhov; Attendance: 1,030; Referee: Georgi Kabakov

28 May 2016 36	Beroe	2–1	Levski Sofia	Stara Zagora
17:00 EEST	Ahmed (yellow card) 41'; Elias 64'; I. Ivanov 68'; Kostov (yellow card) 90'	Report	Kostadinov 29', (yellow card) 75'; S. Aleksandrov (yellow card) 52'	Stadium: Beroe; Attendance: 2,410; Referee: Dragomir Draganov

=== Bulgarian Cup ===
24 September 2015 First round	Pomorie	0–0 (a.e.t.) (2–4 p)	Levski Sofia	Burgas
18:45 EEST	Pehlivanov (yellow card) 63' (yellow-red card) 109'; Shokolarov (yellow card) 90'; Lemperov (yellow card) 111'; Stoyanov (yellow card) 107' (yellow-red card) 116'	Report	Milanov (yellow card) 31'; Kurdov (yellow card) 60'	Stadium: Lazur; Attendance: 1,500; Referee: Stefan Apostolov
	Penalties
	K. Georgiev (penalty scored); Shokolarov (penalty missed); Lemperov (penalty scored); Petkov (penalty missed)		(penalty scored) Procházka; (penalty scored) Kostadinov; (penalty scored) Karner; (penalty missed) Kurdov; (penalty scored) Gadzhev

28 October 2015 Second round	Nesebar	1–3	Levski Sofia	Nesebar
13:30 EEST	Kostov 32'	Report	Kraev 15', 28'; Bedoya 26'; Karner (yellow card) 63'; Orachev (yellow card) 86'	Stadium: Nesebar; Attendance: 1,020; Referee: Georgi Kabakov

8 December 2015 Quarterfinals	Litex Lovech	3–0 (a.e.t.)	Levski Sofia	Lovech
17:30 EET	Kolev (yellow card) 47'; Helton (red card) 64'; Arsénio 101'; Vinícius (yellow card) 105'; Despodov 109', 112'	Report	de Nooijer (yellow card) 39'; Milanov (yellow card) 75'; Belaïd (yellow card) 99'; Dimitrov (yellow card) 117'	Stadium: Gradski; Attendance: 4,250; Referee: Tasko Taskov

== Squad statistics ==
As of match played 29 August 2016
