= 2014–15 PFC Levski Sofia season =

Levski Sofia
2014–15 season
- President: Todor Batkov
- Manager: José Murcia (until 4 August 2014); Georgi Ivanov (until 22 December 2014); Stoycho Stoev (from 22 December 2014)
- Stadium: Georgi Asparuhov; Vasil Levski National Stadium (for derby games only)
- A Group: 7th
- Bulgarian Cup: Runners-up
- Top goalscorer: League: Añete (14 goals); All: Añete (16 goals)
- Highest home attendance: 15 000 vs Ludogorets Razgrad (29 April)
- Lowest home attendance: 0 vs Botev Plovdiv (17 August)
Home colours	Away colours

The 2014–15 season was Levski Sofia's 94th season in the First League. This article shows player statistics and all matches (official and friendly) that the club has played during the season.

== Summary ==
=== June, July, August ===
After a frustrating 2013–14 season Levski found themselves in 5th position and missing participation in European competitions for the first time since 1990. The disappointing season lead to the release of a lot of players mainly foreigners with big salaries. Those releases were a result of the club's bad financial condition. Stanislav Angelov announced his retirement from professional football after a friendly game against SS Lazio which marked the 100th anniversary of the club. Vladimir Gadzhev and Dimitar Makriev's contracts were not renewed while players like Kevin Bru, Larsen Touré, Rafael Bastos, Cristóvão da Silva Ramos, Pavel Čmovš, Ricardo Nunes and Dustley Mulder were released on free transfers.

On 19 May club legend Georgi Ivanov returned to the club as a sports director and announced the club plans to change the transfer policy and sign only local players. As a result of that ex-Levski players Valeri Domovchiyski, Borislav Stoychev and Lachezar Baltanov returned to the club. Ivanov also made some changes in the staff releasing the chief scouts Doncho Donev and Kiril Vangelov. Club icon Daniel Borimirov was appointed as head of the Youth department.

On 5 June 2014 Georgi Ivanov announced the appointment of the Spanish manager José Murcia as the head coach of the team. The contract would be for a 2-year time. This was the first time in the club's history when a Spanish coach is in charge of Levski Sofia. 'Pepe' Murcia is going to be the 13th foreign coach to lead the Blues in their 100 years of history. The appointing of Murcia bring some more changes in the staff at Levski which included hiring methodologist David Serano for the Youth academy. As the pre-season started Pepe Murcia appointed Valeri Bojinov as the new captain of the team. Former player Dimitar Telkiyski also joined the club being appointed as youth coach and assistant of Georgi Todorov at the new formed U-21 team of the club.

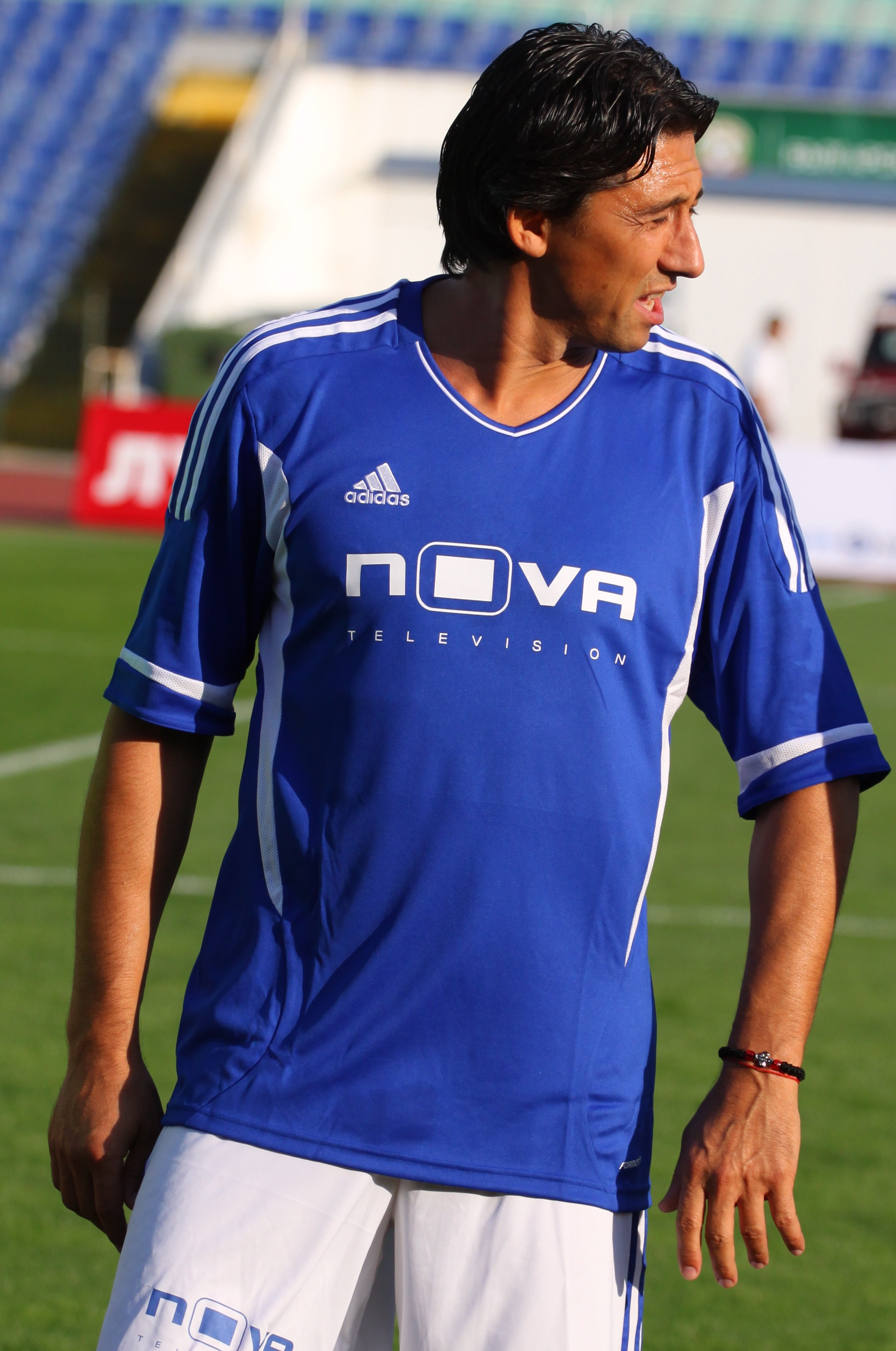
Daniel Borimirov returned to the club as head of the youth department.

In the first day of July Vladimir Gadzhev returned to the club and signed a new 1-year contract after failing to find a new club abroad in which to continue his career. On 8 July attacking midfielder Miguel Bedoya signed a 2-year contract with the club. 10 days later Levski signed with another Spanish player Añete. Bedoya and Añete are the 3rd and 4th Spanish players to play for the club after Toni Calvo and Alejandro Pérez. Veselin Minev also returned to the club signing a 2-year contract which wasn't accepted well from the fans and at the friendly game against Haskovo the supporters swore at the left back. In the meantime 18-year-old youngster from the academy Deyan Ivanov signed his first professional contract with the club. The defender will stay with the Blues until 2017.

Levski Sofia finished their pre-season preparation with 3 wins, 2 draws and 1 loss. The Blues started the campaign with a home 1–1 draw against Lokomotiv Plovdiv on 19 July. On 27 July Levski suffered their 5th lost derby in-a-row after a 0–2 loss against CSKA Sofia. A week later the Blues secured their first win of the season beating Lokomotiv Sofia with 1–0 after a goal scored by Roman Procházka. However a few days later manager Pepe Murcia was released and sports director Georgi Ivanov took in charge being director and head coach at the same time. This was the 4th time in history when Ivanov is taking charge as head coach of the first team.

The first game under the management of Georgi Ivanov was away against Beroe in Stara Zagora. Levski lost 2–1 after 2 mistakes by goalkeeper Stefano Kunchev which led to his release from the club. After the match Georgi Ivanov announced that from 1 January 2015 Dimitar Dimitrov will take charge as head coach of the club. The following round Levski snatched a late 2–1 win against Botev Plovdiv with goals scored by Vladimir Gadzhev and Luis Pedro in the last seconds. The match was played in front of empty stands due to a punishment from the Bulgarian Football Union. On 25 August Levski suffered a heavy 3–0 loss in their visit against Litex Lovech. In the end of the game Levski Sofia fans clashed with the local police which led to a further 2-match ban of playing in front of an empty stadium with no spectators.

=== September and October ===
On 1 September Levski secured a second late win in-a-row after beating 1-0 Cherno More Varna with a penalty scored by Valeri Bojinov in 90+4. After the game Georgi Ivanov announced that the team needs a new central forward. During the first week of September Mauricio Gómez, Alexis Allart and Najib Ammari were offered trials at the club. All of them took part in the friendly game against Botev Vratsa won 2–0. Ammari was offered a contract while Gomez and Allart were released from their trials. In the meantime Valeri Bojinov left the club to join Serie B side Ternana. After the 2 week break Levski won another late win against Slavia Sofia followed by a 4–1 away victory against Haskovo. The team also started their campaign in the Bulgarian Cup with a smashing 7–1 away win against Spartak Varna. On 27 September Levski beat Ludogorets against the odds with 3-2 making it their 3rd ever win against the UEFA Champions League participant. Miguel Bedoya scored his first two goals for the Blues with Georgi Sarmov adding the third one. The team won 5 games in total during September.

During the month of October Levski made some disappointing results managing not to win a single game. Draws were made in the away games against Marek and Lokomotiv Plovdiv with a last minute equaliser scored by Martin Kamburov. The bad form continued with another loss in the derby against CSKA Sofia with 0–3. The disappointment for the fans continued with a shocking 0–2 loss against Second Division side Montana for the Bulgarian Cup placing the team in an uncomfortable position before the re-match in the beginning of December.

=== November and December ===
In the beginning of November Levski recorded their first win for over a month with a 1–0 away victory against Lokomotiv Sofia. In the following round The Blues were again punished to play in front of empty stands against Beroe Stara Zagora. Georgi Ivanov's side lost 0-1 finding themselves placed 5th after 18 rounds. On 23 November Levski marked their first win in Plovdiv against Botev since 2009. The 3–0 victory was followed by a 2–2 home draw against Litex. The Blues managed to come back from a 2-goal difference in the Bulgarian Cup and won against Montana 4-0 which qualify them for the quarterfinals of the tournament. Despite that Levski finished the year 2014 with 2 losses in-a-row against Cherno More Varna and Slavia Sofia. The team finished the year 2014 placing 6th in the Championship.

In the winter break it was expected for Dimitar Dimitrov to take in charge the team as announced by the sports manager Georgi Ivanov. Eventually both sides didn't came out with an agreement and Ivanov was forced to look for another coach option. On 22 December 2014 Stoycho Stoev was announced as the new Levski Sofia manager. Stoev signed a 2.5-year deal while Ivanov came back to the sports director position.

=== January and February ===
During the winter break Levski released several players like Plamen Krumov, Anton Ognyanov and others. While Miroslav Ivanov's contract expired and youngster Aleksandar Lyubenov was sent on loan to Septemvri Simitli. The first incoming transfer to arrive was right back Aleksandar Aleksandrov from Cherno More Varna. In the days afterwards the club signed with goalkeeper Bojan Jorgačević and defender Emil Ninu.

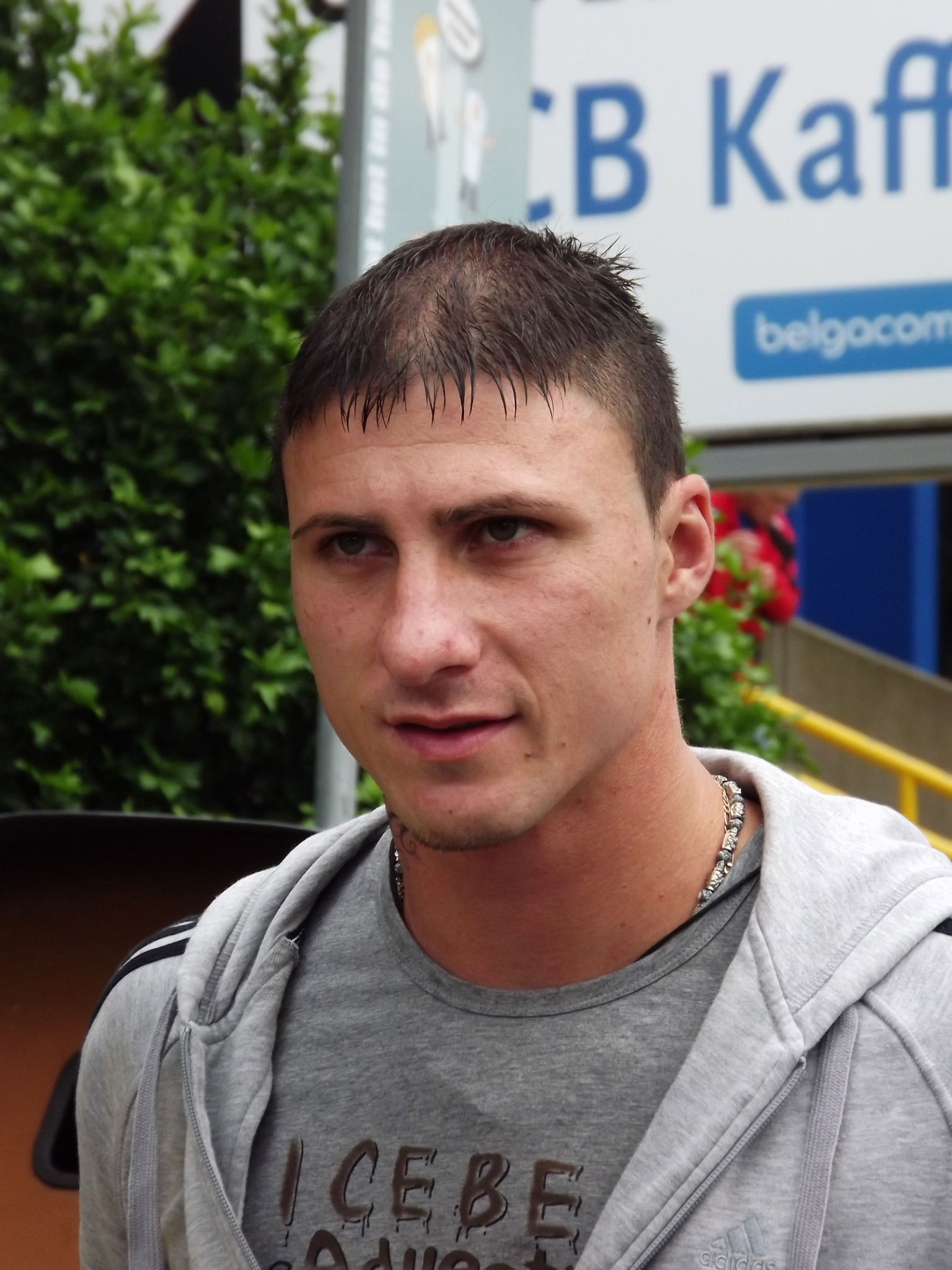
Goalkeeper Bojan Jorgačević signed a contract for one and a half year.

The team started the mid-season preparation with an 8–0 win against Vihren Sandanski. After that the team went to Turkey for their training camp during the winter break. They started with a draw against Vorskla Poltava and a 3–0 win against UEFA Europa League participators Qarabağ FK. The team managed to lose only once to Slovak side Spartak Myjava and made 4 more draws against Lech Poznań, Milsami Orhei, Petrolul Ploiești and Karpaty Lviv. While the game against Armenian Ulisses FC was interrupted due to clashes and fights between the players of both teams. The team finished the training camp in Turkey with 1 win, 5 draws and 1 loss. Valeri Domovchiyski scored 10 goals in total in the friendlies.

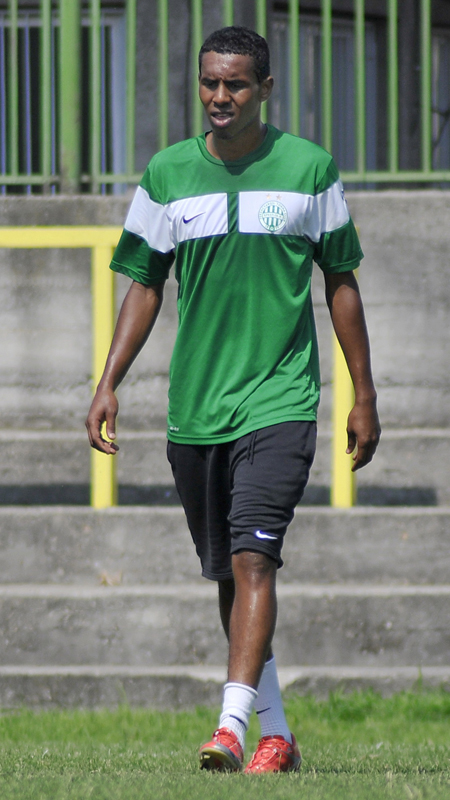
Somali born Liban Abdi moved on loan to Levski until the end of the season.

During the training camp the club managed to sing on loan Somali winger Liban Abdi from Turkish side Rizespor. 10 days before the renewing of the season Levski signed with Polish striker Lukasz Gikiewicz making him the first ever Polish player to play for the club.

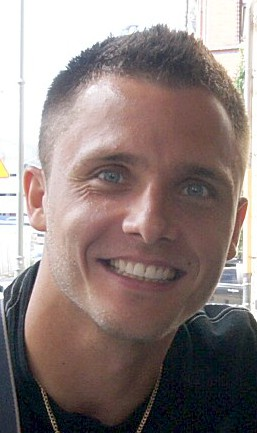
Polish striker Lukasz Gikiewicz signed a contract with the club for 2 years.

The team started 2015 with a 3–0 win against Haskovo in a first leg Quarterfinal of the Bulgarian Cup. Valeri Domovchiyski confirmed his good form by scoring 2 goals while Tihomir Trifonov scored and own goal to fix the final score. Bojan Jorgacevic, Emil Ninu, Liban Abdi and Lukasz Gikiewicz made their official debut for the club in this match.

Levski started their campaign in A Group with a smashing 8–0 win against Haskovo. Valeri Domovchiyski scored a brace and assisted for one more goal notching a total of 11 goals for the season . Spanish playmaker Antonio Salas Quinta also scored twice and made 2 assists, while new signing Liban Abdi made 3 assists in total. Miguel Bedoya and Bozhidar Kraev also scored and Polish striker Lukasz Gikiewicz scored his first goal for the club making the final score 8–0. This was the biggest win in the championship for Levski since 2007.

=== March, April and May ===
In March Levski played their quarterfinal's 2nd leg against Haskovo and made a 1–1 draw. With an aggregate score of 4-1 "The Blues" qualified for the semifinals of the Bulgarian Cup. On 8 March Levski lost 0–1 against Ludogorets Razgrad after a mistake from goalkeeper Plamen Iliev that led to the goal. Although Levski won against Marek Dupnitsa in the last round they were surpassed by Botev Plovdiv who won 3 out of 3 games and Levski played in the relegation group of the championship during the playoffs. The Blues finished 7th which equaled their anti-record. The only other time in history when Levski Sofia finished at 7th place was in season 1937–38.

== Transfers ==
=== Summer transfers ===
In:

No.	Pos.	Nation	Player
—	MF	BUL	Lachezar Baltanov (from Chernomorets Burgas)
—	FW	BUL	Valeri Domovchiyski (from Cherno More Varna)
—	DF	BUL	Borislav Stoychev (from Beroe)
—	MF	SVK	Roman Prochazka (loan return from (Slovakia) Spartak Trnava)
—	DF	BUL	Radoslav Dimitrov (from Slavia Sofia)
—	GK	BUL	Stefano Kunchev (from Chernomorets Burgas)
—	DF	BUL	Veselin Minev (from Botev Plovdiv)
—	MF	ESP	Miguel Bedoya (from (Spain) Numancia)
—	GK	MKD	Kristijan Naumovski (from (Romania) Dinamo București)
—	MF	BUL	Georgi Sarmov (from Botev Plovdiv)
—	FW	NED	Luis Pedro (from Botev Plovdiv)
—	FW	ESP	Antonio Salas Quinta (from (Greece) Niki Volos)
—	FW	ALG	Najib Ammari (from (Romania) CFR Cluj)

Out:

No.	Pos.	Nation	Player
1	GK	CRO	Goran Blažević (to (Russia) Torpedo Moscow)
2	DF	NED	Dustley Mulder (released)
4	DF	BUL	Stanislav Angelov (retired)
6	MF	BUL	Orlin Starokin (end of contract)
7	FW	BUL	Dimitar Makriev (end of contract)
9	FW	BUL	Tsvetan Genkov (released)
16	MF	BRA	Rafael Bastos (released)
17	DF	CZE	Pavel Čmovš (released)
25	MF	BUL	Daniel Dimov (end of contract)
28	MF	POR	Cristóvão Ramos (released)
28	DF	BUL	Radoslav Dimitrov (released)
30	MF	BUL	Lachezar Baltanov (released)
32	GK	BUL	Stefano Kunchev (released)
40	DF	POR	Ricardo Nunes (released)
59	FW	GUI	Larsen Touré (released)
75	MF	MRI	Kevin Bru (released)
86	FW	BUL	Valeri Bojinov (to (Italy) Ternana Calcio)
89	GK	BUL	Mihail Ivanov (released)

See List of Bulgarian football transfers summer 2014

=== Winter transfers ===
In:

No.	Pos.	Nation	Player
29	GK	SRB	Bojan Jorgačević (from (Turkey) Erciyesspor)
2	DF	BUL	Aleksandar Aleksandrov (from Cherno More Varna)
31	DF	ROU	Emil Ninu (from (Romania) Universitatea Cluj)
7	FW	NOR	Liban Abdi (on loan from (Turkey) Çaykur Rizespor)
9	FW	POL	Łukasz Gikiewicz (from (Cyprus) AEL Limassol)

Out:

No.	Pos.	Nation	Player
16	MF	BUL	Miroslav Ivanov (end of contract)
1	GK	MKD	Kristijan Naumovski (released)
71	DF	BUL	Plamen Krumov (released)
7	DF	BUL	Anton Ognyanov (released)
35	DF	BUL	Plamen Dimov (released)
13	MF	ALG	Najib Ammari (released)
24	GK	BUL	Aleksandar Lyubenov (on loan to Septemvri Simitli)

See List of Bulgarian football transfers winter 2014–15

== Squad ==
Updated on 26 May 2015.

Squad No.	Name	Nationality	Position(s)	Since	Date of birth (Age)	Previously at	Games played	Goals scored
Goalkeepers
23	Plamen Iliev	Bulgaria	GK	2011	30 November 1991 (age 34)	(Bulgaria) Vidima-Rakovski	123	0
29	Bojan Jorgačević	Serbia	GK	2015	12 February 1982 (age 44)	(Turkey) Erciyesspor	11	0
Defenders
2	Aleksandar Aleksandrov	Bulgaria	RB	2015	30 July 1986 (age 40)	(Bulgaria) Cherno More Varna	11	0
3	Aymen Belaïd	Tunisia	CB	2014	2 January 1987 (age 39)	(Bulgaria) Lokomotiv Plovdiv	41	1
4	Miki Orachev	Bulgaria	LB	–	19 March 1996 (age 30)	(Bulgaria) Levski Academy	19	1
5	Borislav Stoychev	Bulgaria	CB	2014	26 November 1986 (age 39)	(Bulgaria) Beroe	49	2
14	Veselin Minev	Bulgaria	LB	2014	14 October 1980 (age 46)	(Bulgaria) Botev Plovdiv	157	1
31	Emil Ninu	Romania	LB, CB, RB	2015	28 August 1986 (age 40)	(Romania) Universitatea Cluj	11	1
33	Galin Tashev	Bulgaria	LB / CB	–	2 February 1997 (age 29)	(Bulgaria) Levski Academy	3	0
39	Deyan Ivanov	Bulgaria	CB	–	12 April 1996 (age 30)	(Bulgaria) Levski Academy	1	0
Midfielders
8	Georgi Sarmov	Bulgaria	DM / CM	2014	7 September 1985 (age 41)	(Bulgaria) Botev Plovdiv	119	10
10	Miguel Bedoya	Spain	AM	2014	15 April 1986 (age 40)	(Spain) Numancia	35	9
11	Luis Pedro	Netherlands	LW / RW	2014	27 April 1990 (age 36)	(Bulgaria) Botev Plovdiv	25	4
12	Bozhidar Kraev	Bulgaria	AM	–	23 June 1997 (age 29)	(Bulgaria) Levski Academy	26	9
15	Roman Procházka	Slovakia	CM	2012	14 March 1989 (age 37)	(Slovakia) Spartak Trnava	62	3
18	Borislav Tsonev	Bulgaria	CM	–	29 April 1995 (age 31)	(Bulgaria) Levski Academy	32	4
21	Radoslav Tsonev	Bulgaria	CM	–	29 April 1995 (age 31)	(Bulgaria) Levski Academy	26	4
22	Vladislav Misyak	Bulgaria	LW	–	15 July 1995 (age 31)	(Bulgaria) Levski Academy	16	2
30	Liban Abdi	Norway	LW / RW	2015	5 October 1988 (age 38)	(Turkey) Rizespor	13	2
45	Vladimir Gadzhev	Bulgaria	DM / CM	2008	18 July 1987 (age 39)	(Greece) Panathinaikos	202	26
77	Stefan Velev	Bulgaria	DM / CM	2013	2 May 1989 (age 37)	(Bulgaria) Beroe	48	1
Strikers
9	Łukasz Gikiewicz	Poland	ST	2015	26 October 1987 (age 39)	(Cyprus) AEL Limassol	9	3
17	Valeri Domovchiyski	Bulgaria	ST	2014	5 October 1986 (age 40)	(Bulgaria) Cherno More	140	67
19	Iliya Dimitrov	Bulgaria	ST	–	10 July 1996 (age 30)	(Bulgaria) Levski Academy	4	0
20	Antonio Salas Quinta	Spain	AM / FW	2014	1 October 1985 (age 41)	(Greece) Niki Volos	34	16

== Statistics ==
- Note – players not in **bold** had left the team during the season.

=== Goalscorers ===
Player	League	Cup	Total
(Spain) **Añete**	14	2	16
(Bulgaria) **Valeri Domovchiyski**	10	4	14
(Spain) **Miguel Bedoya**	8	1	9
(Bulgaria) **Bozhidar Kraev**	6	3	9
(Bulgaria) **Vladimir Gadzhev**	5	0	5
(Slovakia) **Roman Prochazka**	4	0	4
(Poland) **Lukasz Gikiewicz**	2	1	3
(Netherlands) **Luis Pedro**	3	0	3
(Bulgaria) **Radoslav Tsonev**	2	1	3
(Bulgaria) **Borislav Tsonev**	3	0	3
(Bulgaria) Miroslav Ivanov	1	1	2
(Bulgaria) **Georgi Sarmov**	2	0	2
(Norway) **Liban Abdi**	2	0	2
(Bulgaria) Valeri Bojinov	1	0	1
(Bulgaria) **Vladislav Misyak**	0	1	1
(Tunisia) **Aymen Belaid**	0	1	1
(Romania) **Emil Ninu**	1	0	1
(Bulgaria) **Miki Orachev**	1	0	1

=== Assists ===
Player	League	Cup	Total
(Spain) **Añete**	11	0	11
(Slovakia) **Roman Prochazka**	5	2	7
(Spain) **Miguel Bedoya**	6	1	7
(Norway) **Liban Abdi**	5	1	6
(Bulgaria) **Valeri Domovchiyski**	4	0	4
(Bulgaria) **Vladimir Gadzhev**	3	0	3
(Bulgaria) **Bozhidar Kraev**	1	2	3
(Bulgaria) **Veselin Minev**	3	0	3
(Bulgaria) Plamen Krumov	2	1	3
(Bulgaria) **Miki Orachev**	1	2	3
(Bulgaria) **Borislav Tsonev**	3	0	3
(Bulgaria) Anton Ognyanov	0	2	2
(Poland) **Lukasz Gikiewicz**	2	0	2
(Netherlands) **Luis Pedro**	2	0	2
(Bulgaria) **Aleksandar Aleksandrov**	2	0	2
(Bulgaria) **Radoslav Tsonev**	1	0	1
(Bulgaria) **Borislav Stoychev**	0	1	1
(Tunisia) **Aymen Belaid**	1	0	1
(Bulgaria) **Vladislav Misyak**	1	0	1

=== Cards ===
Player	Yellow card	Red card	Total
(Netherlands) **Luis Pedro**	8	2	10
(Slovakia) **Roman Prochazka**	9	0	9
(Bulgaria) **Vladimir Gadzhev**	9	0	9
(Tunisia) **Aymen Belaid**	7	2	9
(Bulgaria) **Veselin Minev**	7	1	8
(Bulgaria) **Borislav Stoychev**	7	0	7
(Spain) **Añete**	6	1	7
(Spain) **Miguel Bedoya**	7	0	7
(Bulgaria) Plamen Krumov	6	0	6
(Bulgaria) Plamen Dimov	6	0	6
(Bulgaria) **Stefan Velev**	6	0	6
(Bulgaria) **Georgi Sarmov**	4	0	4
(Bulgaria) Miroslav Ivanov	2	1	3
(Bulgaria) **Valeri Domovchiyski**	3	0	3
(Bulgaria) **Radoslav Tsonev**	3	0	3
(Bulgaria) Anton Ognyanov	2	0	2
(Bulgaria) **Aleksandar Aleksandrov**	2	0	2
(Poland) **Lukasz Gikiewicz**	2	0	2
(Serbia) **Bojan Jorgačević**	2	0	2
(Bulgaria) **Bozhidar Kraev**	2	0	2
(Norway) **Liban Abdi**	2	0	2
(Algeria) Najib Ammari	1	0	1
(Bulgaria) **Miki Orachev**	1	0	1
(Bulgaria) **Vladislav Misyak**	1	0	1
(Bulgaria) **Radoslav Tsonev**	1	0	1
(Romania) **Emil Ninu**	1	0	1

== Friendlies ==
=== Summer ===
21 June 2014	Levski Sofia	5–0	Levski Sofia U-21	Pravets
18:00 EET	Stoychev 17'; Prochazka 32'; Misyak 60'; Dimitrov 74'; Orachev 78'	Report

27 June 2014	Levski Sofia	1–1	Montana	Pravets
10:00 EET	Velev 59'	Report	Lazarov 34'

2 July 2014	Levski Sofia	1–1	Lokomotiv Sofia	Pravets
18:30 EET	Bozhidar Kraev 62'	Report	Dimitrov 58'

6 July 2014	Levski Sofia	0–3	Beroe Stara Zagora	Pravets
18:30 EET		Report	Dimov 38' (o.g.); Mapuku 40'; Kerkar 65'

9 July 2014	Levski Sofia	3–0	Marek	Pravets
18:30 EET	Stoychev 6'; Bojinov 8' 75' (pen.)	Report

12 July 2014	Levski Sofia	2–1	Haskovo	Sofia
18:30 EET	Miguel Bedoya 10'; Bojinov 15'	Report	Angelov 50'	Stadium: Georgi Asparuhov Stadium

=== Mid-season ===
7 September 2014	Levski Sofia	2–0	Botev Vratsa	Sofia
18:00 EET	Bedoya 2'; Domovchiyski 15'	Report		Stadium: Georgi Asparuhov Stadium; Attendance: 3 500

11 October 2014	Levski Sofia	1–0	Bansko	Sofia
16:00 EET	Velev 35'	Report		Stadium: Georgi Asparuhov Stadium; Attendance: 1 000

15 November 2014	Levski Sofia	2–0	Pirin Razlog	Sofia
14:00 EET	Anete 50'; Domovchiyski 58'	Report		Stadium: Georgi Asparuhov Stadium; Attendance: 500

=== Winter ===
16 January 2014	Vihren Sandanski	0–8	Levski Sofia	Sandanski
13:30 EET		Report	Domovchiyski 8' 10' 75'; Luís Pedro 29'; Iliya Dimitrov 52'; Procházka 55'; Tsonev 60'; Miguel Bedoya 80'	Stadium: Sandanski Stadium; Attendance: 1 500

21 January 2014	Levski Sofia (Bulgaria)	1–1	(Ukraine) Vorskla Poltava	Antalya
15:30 EET	Kraev 62'	Report	Sapay 28'

24 January 2014	Levski Sofia (Bulgaria)	3–0	(Azerbaijan) Qarabağ	Antalya
17:30 EET	Domovchiyski 7' (pen.) 46'; Añete 50' (pen.)	Report	Richard Almeida (penalty missed) 3'; Danilo Dias (penalty missed) 69'

28 January 2014	Levski Sofia (Bulgaria)	0–0	(Moldova) FC Milsami Orhei	Antalya
17:30 EET	Miguel Bedoya (penalty missed) 10'	Report

3 February 2014	Levski Sofia (Bulgaria)	1–2 (Interrupted)	(Armenia) Ulisses	Antalya
17:30 EET	Domovchiyski 13' (pen.)	Report	Chemamba 43'; Khurtsidze 57'

5 February 2014	Levski Sofia (Bulgaria)	2–2	(Poland) Lech Poznań	Antalya
17:00 EET	Domovchiyski 9' (pen.) (penalty missed) 33' 36'	Report	Ubiparip 17'; Jevtić 76'

7 February 2014	Levski Sofia (Bulgaria)	0–1	(Slovakia) Spartak Myjava	Antalya
16:30 EET		Report	Pekár 20' (pen.)

10 February 2014	Levski Sofia (Bulgaria)	1–1	(Romania) Petrolul Ploiești	Antalya
17:30 EET	Kraev 66'	Report	Mareș 81'

12 February 2014	Levski Sofia (Bulgaria)	3–3	(Ukraine) Karpaty Lviv	Antalya
17:30 EET	Abdi 34'; Domovchiyski 65' 86'	Report	Hitchenko 39'; Marian Shved 44' 88'

== Competitions ==
=== Overall ===
	Competition	Position
(Bulgaria)	Bulgarian Cup	Final
(Bulgaria)	A Group	7th

=== A Group ===
==== First phase ====
Pos	Team	Pld	W	D	L	GF	GA	GD	Pts	Qualification
5	Beroe Stara Zagora	22	11	5	6	34	21	+13	38	Qualification for championship group
6	Botev Plovdiv	22	11	3	8	32	26	+6	36	Qualification for championship group
7	Levski Sofia	22	10	4	8	36	25	+11	34	Qualification for relegation group
8	Cherno More Varna	22	9	4	9	26	24	+2	31	Qualification for relegation group
9	Slavia Sofia	22	6	5	11	24	30	−6	23	Qualification for relegation group

Source: bulgarian-football.com
Rules for classification: 1st points; 2nd head-to-head points; 3rd head-to-head goal difference; 4th head-to-head goals scored; 5th head-to-head away goals scored; 6th season goal difference; 7th season goals scored; 8th "sportsmanship" (R & Y cards); 9th draw

===== Results summary =====
Overall								Home						Away					
Pld	W	D	L	GF	GA	GD	Pts	W	D	L	GF	GA	GD	W	D	L	GF	GA	GD
22	10	4	8	36	25	+11	34	7	2	2	24	10	+14	3	2	6	12	15	−3

Source: Competitive matches

===== Results by round =====
Round	1	2	3	4	5	6	7	8	9	10	11	12	13	14	15	16	17	18	19	20	21	22
Ground	H	A	H	A	H	A	H	H	A	H	A	A	H	A	H	A	H	A	A	H	A	H
Result	D	L	W	L	W	L	W	W	W	W	D	D	L	W	L	W	D	L	L	W	L	W
Position	5	11	6	10	6	7	7	7	5	3	3	4	6	4	4	4	4	6	6	6	7	7

A = Away; H = Home; W = Win; D = Draw; L = Loss

===== Matches =====
19 July 2014 1	Levski Sofia	1–1	Lokomotiv Plovdiv	Sofia
19:30 (EET)	Domovchiyski 81'	Report	Nakov 76'	Stadium: Georgi Asparuhov Stadium; Attendance: 4,500; Referee: Tasko Taskov

27 July 2014 2	CSKA Sofia	2–0	Levski Sofia	Sofia
19:30 (EET)	Karachanakov 47'; Buș 55'	Report	Luis Pedro (yellow card) 83' (red card)	Stadium: Vasil Levski National Stadium; Attendance: 12,000; Referee: Georgi Yordanov

2 August 2014 3	Levski Sofia	1–0	Lokomotiv Sofia	Sofia
20:00 (EET)	Procházka 51'	Report		Stadium: Georgi Asparuhov Stadium; Attendance: 1,000; Referee: Tsvetan Krastev

10 August 2014 4	Beroe Stara Zagora	2–1	Levski Sofia	Stara Zagora
20:00 (EET)	Mapuku 6', 22'	Report	Domovchiyski 36'	Stadium: Beroe Stadium; Attendance: 6,700; Referee: Tsvetan Krastev

17 August 2014 5	Levski Sofia	2–1	Botev Plovdiv	Sofia
20:00 (EET)	Gadzhev 50'; Luis Pedro 90+3'	Report	Chunchukov 17'	Stadium: Georgi Asparuhov Stadium; Attendance: 0 Referee: Stanislav Todorov

25 August 2014 6	Litex Lovech	3–0	Levski Sofia	Lovech
(EET)	Asprilla 22'; Kossoko 40'; Zlatinov 90+4'; Popov (red card) 90+6'	Report		Stadium: Lovech Stadium; Attendance: 4,000; Referee: Georgi Yordanov

1 September 2014 7	Levski Sofia	1–0	Cherno More Varna	Sofia
(EET)	Bojinov 90+5' (pen.)	Report	Atanasov (red card) 90+4'	Stadium: Georgi Asparuhov Stadium; Attendance: 0 Referee: Ivaylo Stoyanov

14 September 2014 8	Levski Sofia	2–0	Slavia Sofia	Sofia
18:45 (EET)	Procházka 85'; Añete 90+3'	Report		Stadium: Georgi Asparuhov Stadium; Attendance: 0 Referee: Tasko Taskov

20 September 2014 9	Haskovo	1–4	Levski Sofia	Haskovo
16:45 (EET)	Angelov 84' (pen.)	Report	Luis Pedro 26'; Domovchiyski 40'; Gadzhev 75'; Añete 77'; Belaid (red card) 83'	Stadium: Haskovo Stadium; Attendance: 5,000; Referee: Radan Miryanov

27 September 2014 10	Levski Sofia	3–2	Ludogorets Razgrad	Sofia
19:30 (EET)	Bedoya 5' 37'; Sarmov 27'	Report	Moți 16' (pen.); Caiçara (red card) 43'; Wanderson 78'	Stadium: Georgi Asparuhov Stadium; Attendance: 10,000; Referee: Georgi Kabakov

4 October 2014 11	Marek Dupnitsa	1–1	Levski Sofia	Dupnitsa
15:00 (EET)	Bonev 62'	Report	Gadzhev (penalty missed) 67'; Ivanov 79' (pen.)	Stadium: Bonchuk Stadium; Attendance: 5,000; Referee: Georgi Ignatov

18 October 2014 12	Lokomotiv Plovdiv	1–1	Levski Sofia	Plovdiv
17:15 (EET)	Kamburov 90+3'	Report	Bedoya 42'	Stadium: Lokomotiv Stadium; Attendance: 5,000

25 October 2014 13	Levski Sofia	0–3	CSKA Sofia	Sofia
16:00 (EET)		Report	Toni Silva 22'; Buș 45+3'; Galchev 85'	Stadium: Vasil Levski National Stadium; Attendance: 15,000; Referee: Ivaylo Stoyanov

2 November 2014 14	Lokomotiv Sofia	0–1	Levski Sofia	Sofia
13:00 (EET)		Report	Añete 39'	Stadium: Lokomotiv Stadium; Attendance: 5,000; Referee: Nikola Popov

7 November 2014 15	Levski Sofia	0–1	Beroe	Sofia
17:45 (EET)	Ivanov (yellow card) 55' (red card)	Report	Elias 68'	Stadium: Georgi Asparuhov Stadium; Attendance: 0 Referee: Tsvetan Krastev

23 November 2014 16	Botev Plovdiv	0–3	Levski Sofia	Plovdiv
13:15 (EET)	Vasev (yellow card) 44' (red card)	Report	Luis Pedro (red card) 53'; Procházka 64'; Sarmov 79'; Miguel Bedoya 88'	Stadium: Komatevo Stadium; Attendance: 3,500; Referee: Stefan Pavlov

29 November 2014 17	Levski Sofia	2–2	Litex Lovech	Sofia
16:00 (EET)	Domovchiyski 28'; Añete 44'	Report	Malinov 8'; Despodov 66'	Stadium: Georgi Asparuhov Stadium; Attendance: 4,000; Referee: Ivaylo Stoyanov

6 December 2014 18	Cherno More Varna	1–0	Levski Sofia	Varna
12:30 (EET)	Coureur 43'; Burkhardt (yellow card) 89' (red card)	Report	Añete (red card) 90'	Stadium: Ticha Stadium; Attendance: 5,000; Referee: Georgi Yordanov

13 December 2014 19	Slavia Sofia	3–1	Levski Sofia	Sofia
13:15 (EET)	Manzorro 43', 68', 87'; Ferraresso (yellow card) 85' (red card)	Report	Belaid (yellow card) 45' (red card); Domovchiyski 54' (pen.)	Stadium: Slavia Stadium; Attendance: 1,000; Referee: Georgi Kabakov

27 February 2015 20	Levski Sofia	8–0	Haskovo	Sofia
17:00 (EET)	Domovchiyski 3', 18'; Añete 9', 89'; Bedoya 23'; Kraev 46'; Ninu 63'; Gikiewicz 90'	Report		Stadium: Georgi Asparuhov Stadium; Attendance: 500; Referee: Tasko Taskov

8 March 2015 21	Ludogorets Razgrad	1–0	Levski Sofia	Razgrad
15:30 (EET)	Wanderson 61'	Report		Stadium: Ludogorets Arena; Attendance: 6,000; Referee: Nikolay Yordanov

14 March 2015 22	Levski Sofia	4–0	Marek Dupnitsa	Sofia
17:00 (EET)	Añete 15'; Gadzhev 39', 42'; Abdi 47'	Report		Stadium: Georgi Asparuhov Stadium; Attendance: 1,000; Referee: Aleksandar Kostadinov

==== Relegation group ====
Pos	Team	Pld	W	D	L	GF	GA	GD	Pts	Qualification or relegation
7	Levski Sofia	32	17	5	10	66	33	+33	56	
8	Cherno More	32	15	5	12	42	36	+6	50	Qualification for Europa League second qualifying round (Note: Cherno More Varna qualified for the 2015–16 UEFA Europa League second qualifying round by winning the 2014–15 Bulgarian Cup.)
9	Slavia Sofia	32	12	7	13	40	38	+2	43	
10	Lokomotiv Plovdiv	32	9	5	18	28	52	−24	32	
11	Marek (R)	32	5	5	22	14	71	−57	20	Relegation to 2015-16 V Group
12	Haskovo (R)	32	4	3	25	18	71	−53	15	Relegation to 2015-16 V Group

Source: bulgarian-football.com, UEFA.com (in English)
Rules for classification: 1st points; 2nd head-to-head points; 3rd head-to-head goal difference; 4th head-to-head goals scored; 5th head-to-head away goals scored; 6th season goal difference; 7th season goals scored; 8th "sportsmanship" (R & Y cards); 9th draw
(R) Relegated

===== Results summary =====
Overall								Home						Away					
Pld	W	D	L	GF	GA	GD	Pts	W	D	L	GF	GA	GD	W	D	L	GF	GA	GD
10	7	1	2	29	8	+21	22	3	1	1	19	6	+13	4	0	1	10	2	+8

Source: Competitive matches

===== Results by round =====
Round	1	2	3	4	5	6	7	8	9	10
Ground	H	H	A	H	A	A	A	H	A	H
Result	D	W	L	W	W	W	W	L	W	W
Position	7	7	7	7	7	7	7	7	7	7

A = Away; H = Home; W = Win; D = Draw; L = Loss

===== Matches =====
20 March 2015 23	Levski Sofia	1–1	Haskovo	Sofia
17:45 (EET)	Añete 69'	Report	Aleksiev 15'	Stadium: Georgi Asparuhov Stadium; Attendance: 500; Referee: Dragomir Draganov

3 April 2015 24	Levski Sofia	5–2	Cherno More Varna	Sofia
20:00 (EET)	Abdi 4'; Kraev 17'; Domovchiyski 23'; Coulibaly 76' (o.g.); B. Tsonev 90+2'	Report	Zlatinov 9'; Raykov 73'	Stadium: Georgi Asparuhov Stadium; Attendance: 500; Referee: Vladimir Valkov

11 April 2015 25	Slavia Sofia	1–0	Levski Sofia	Sofia
17:00 (EET)	Fonseca 33'	Report		Stadium: Ovcha Kupel Stadium; Attendance: 3,000; Referee: Georgi Kabakov

17 April 2015 26	Levski Sofia	5–0	Lokomotiv Plovdiv	Sofia
20:00 (EET)	Domovchiyski 17' (pen.); Procházka 48'; Añete 55', 58', 85'; Abdi (penalty missed) 66'	Report		Stadium: Georgi Asparuhov Stadium; Attendance: 2,000; Referee: Stefan Pavlov

25 April 2015 27	Marek Dupnitsa	1–3	Levski Sofia	Dupnitsa
17:00 (EET)	Dimitrov 45+2'	Report	Gikiewicz 28'; Luis Pedro 63'; B. Tsonev 83' (pen.)	Stadium: Bonchuk Stadium; Attendance: 2,000; Referee: Martin Aleksandrov

4 May 2015 28	Haskovo	0–5	Levski Sofia	Haskovo
18:00 (EET)		Report	Bedoya 19', 67'; Kraev 54'; Añete 60'; Orachev 89'	Stadium: Haskovo Stadium; Attendance: 500; Referee: Petar Dorovski

9 May 2015 29	Cherno More Varna	0–2	Levski Sofia	Varna
17:30 (EET)		Report	Domovchiyski 74'; Bedoya 90+2'	Stadium: Ticha Stadium; Attendance: 5,000; Referee: Martin Stoimenov

16 May 2015 30	Levski Sofia	2–3	Slavia Sofia	Sofia
20:00 (EET)	R. Tsonev 45', 89'; Minev (yellow card) 78' (red card)	Report	Pirgov 24'; Atanasov 65'; Manzorro 87'	Stadium: Georgi Asparuhov Stadium; Attendance: 3,000; Referee: Nikola Popov

22 May 2015 31	Lokomotiv Plovdiv	0–1	Levski Sofia	Plovdiv
20:00 (EET)		Report	Gadzhev 59'	Stadium: Lokomotiv Stadium; Attendance: 2,000; Referee: Angel Angelov

26 May 2015 32	Levski Sofia	6–0	Marek Dupnitsa	Sofia
20:00 (EET)	Kraev 32', 40', 57'; B. Tsonev 51' (pen.); Añete 84' 88'	Report		Stadium: Georgi Asparuhov Stadium; Attendance: 200; Referee: Georgi Davidov

=== Bulgarian Cup ===
23 September 2014 First round	Spartak Varna	1–7	Levski Sofia	Varna
16:00 EEST	Diyan Malchev 90+3'	Report	Ivanov 8'; R. Tsonev 24'; Kraev 40', 53', 89'; Misyak 73'; Domovchiyski 76'	Stadium: Spartak Stadium; Attendance: 3,000; Referee: Vladimir Valkov

28 October 2014 Second round 1st leg	Montana	2–0	Levski Sofia	Montana
13:00 EEST	S. Georgiev 42'; Minchev 57'	Report		Stadium: Ogosta Stadium; Attendance: 1,500; Referee: Stanislav Todorov

3 December 2014 Second round 2nd leg	Levski Sofia	4–0 (4−2 agg.)	Montana	Sofia
EEST	Añete 12' (pen.); Belaïd 38'; Domovchiyski 66'; Bedoya 90'	Report	Georgiev (yellow card) 82' (red card)	Stadium: Georgi Asparuhov; Attendance: 1,000; Referee: Nikolay Yordanov

21 February 2015 Quarterfinals 1st leg	Levski Sofia	3–0	Haskovo	Sofia
17:00 EEST	Domovchiyski 21' (pen.), 33'; Trifonov 90' (o.g.)	Report		Stadium: Georgi Asparuhov Stadium; Attendance: 5,000; Referee: Stefan Apostolov

3 March 2015 Quarterfinals 2nd leg	Haskovo	1–1 (1−4 agg.)	Levski Sofia	Haskovo
14:00 EEST	Malamov 81'	Report	Gikiewicz 42'	Stadium: Haskovo Stadium; Attendance: 4,000; Referee: Angel Bayaltsaliev

8 April 2015 Semifinals 1st leg	Ludogorets Razgrad	0–0	Levski Sofia	Razgrad
19:00 EEST		Report		Stadium: Ludogorets Arena; Attendance: 5,500; Referee: Tsvetan Krastev

29 April 2015 Semifinals 2nd leg	Levski Sofia	1–0 (1−0 agg.)	Ludogorets Razgrad	Sofia
18:45 EEST	Añete 90'	Report		Stadium: Georgi Asparuhov Stadium; Attendance: 15,000; Referee: Ivaylo Stoyanov

30 May 2015 Final	Cherno More Varna	2–1 (a.e.t.)	Levski Sofia	Burgas
20:00 EEST	Bacari 90+2'; Coureur 119'	Report	Añete 72'	Stadium: Lazur Stadium; Attendance: 13,910; Referee: Ivaylo Stoyanov
