= Stoev =

Stoev (masculine, Bulgarian: Стоев) or Stoeva (feminine, Bulgarian: Стоева) is a Bulgarian surname. Notable people with the surname include:

- Andrey Stoev (born 1986), Bulgarian footballer
- Boris Stoev (1926–1998), Bulgarian cross country skier
- Dzhina Stoeva (born 1976), Bulgarian singer
- Emil Stoev (footballer, born 1986), Bulgarian footballer
- Emil Stoev (footballer, born 1996), Bulgarian footballer
- Gabriela Stoeva (born 1994), Bulgarian badminton player
- Georgi Stoev (1973–2008), Bulgarian writer
- Lachezara Stoeva (born 1977), Bulgarian diplomat
- Martin Stoev (born 1971), Bulgarian volleyball player and coach
- Mladen Stoev (born 1984), Bulgarian footballer
- Stefani Stoeva (born 1995), Bulgarian badminton player
- Stoycho Stoev (born 1962), Bulgarian footballer
- Todor Stoev (born 1988), Bulgarian footballer
- Valcho Stoev (born 1952), Bulgarian shot putter
- Vasilka Stoeva (born 1940), Bulgarian discus thrower
