= Miki Orachev =

Bulgarian footballer

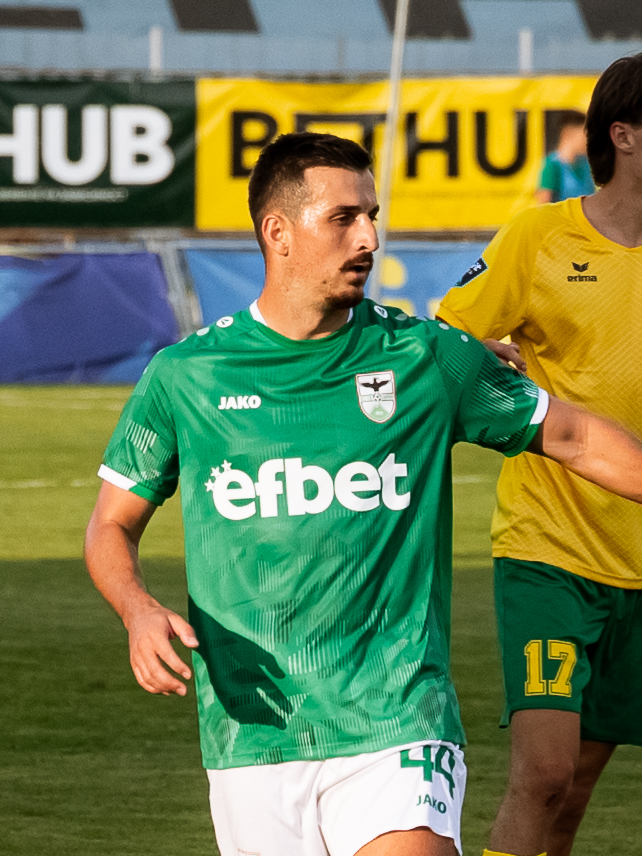

Personal information
- Full name: Miki Rumenov Orachev
- Date of birth: 19 March 1996 (age 30)
- Place of birth: Blagoevgrad, Bulgaria
- Height: 1.71 m (5 ft 7 1/2 in)
- Positions: Left-back; winger

Team information
- Current team: Pirin Blagoevgrad
- Number: 44

Youth career
- –2011: Pirin Blagoevgrad
- 2011–2014: Levski Sofia

Senior career*
Years	Team	Apps	(Gls)
2014–2017	Levski Sofia	49	(1)
2017	→ Lokomotiv Sofia (loan)	13	(0)
2018	Septemvri Sofia	3	(0)
2019	Holzwickeder SC	4	(0)
2019–2023	Lokomotiv Sofia	89	(1)
2023	CSKA 1948	5	(0)
2024–2025	Lokomotiv Sofia	29	(0)
2025–2026	Minyor Pernik	25	(0)
2026–	Pirin Blagoevgrad	7	(0)

International career^{‡}
2011–2013	Bulgaria U17	9	(0)
2013–2014	Bulgaria U19	8	(0)
2015–2016	Bulgaria U21	7	(0)
2022	Bulgaria	1	(0)
- * Club domestic league appearances and goals as of 5 November 2026 ‡ National team caps and goals as of 18:09, 29 March 2022 (UTC)

Miki Rumenov Orachev (Bulgarian: Мики Руменов Орачев; born 19 March 1996) is a Bulgarian footballer who currently plays as a defender for Pirin Blagoevgrad. Orachev prefers to play as a left-back but can also play as a left winger.

== Career ==
=== Levski Sofia ===
==== First spell ====
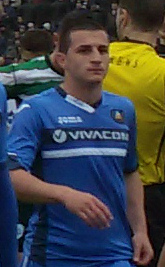
Orachev for Levski in 2016.

Born in Blagoevgrad, Orachev began playing football for local side Pirin. On 19 July 2011, he joined Levski Sofia's academy.

Orachev made his first team debut in a 2–1 league home loss against Litex Lovech on 12 April 2014, coming on as a substitute for Ricardo Nunes. His first goal for the club came on 4 May 2015, a 17-metre strike in a 5–0 win at Haskovo.

On 14 July 2017 he made his Europa League debut for the team in a match against NK Maribor.

==== Loan to Lokomotov Sofia ====
In January 2017, Orachev was loaned to Second League club Lokomotiv Sofia until the end of the season. He made his debut for the team on 25 February 2017 in a league match against Spartak Pleven.

==== Return to Levski ====
Although there was information that his loan would be extended, Orachev returned in the beginning of June from his loan spell. He joined the first training of the team on 13 June 2017.

=== Septemvri Sofia ===
On 22 December 2017 Levski's executive manager Asen Bukarev announced that Orachev would be transferred in Septemvri Sofia. He officially signed a contract on 28 December for a year and a half. He completed his debut for the team on 17 February 2018 in the first league match for the year, against Etar Veliko Tarnovo.

On 7 March he left the field in the 32nd minute due to low blood pressure. On 22 March it was announced that he would miss the rest of the season due to heart problems.

== Statistics ==
=== Club ===
As of 22 March 2018

Club performance			League		Cup		Continental		Other		Total	
Club	League	Season	Apps	Goals	Apps	Goals	Apps	Goals	Apps	Goals	Apps	Goals
Bulgaria			League		Bulgarian Cup		Europe		Other (Note: Includes Bulgarian Supercup matches.)		Total	
Levski Sofia	A Group	2013–14	6	0	1	0	0	0	–		7	0
Levski Sofia	A Group	2014–15	9	1	3	0	–		–		12	1
Levski Sofia	A Group	2015–16	23	0	2	0	–		–		17	0
Levski Sofia	First League	2016–17	3	0	1	0	1	0	—		4	0
Lokomotiv Sofia (loan)	Second League	2016–17	13	0	0	0	–		–		13	0
Levski Sofia	First League	2017–18	8	0	2	0	1	0	–		11	0
Levski Sofia	Total		49	1	9	0	2	0	0	0	60	1
Septemvri Sofia	First League	2017–18	3	0	0	0	–		–		3	0
Career statistics			64	1	9	0	2	0	0	0	75	1

== Personal life ==
Miki is a cousin of the retired footballer and now manager Malin Orachev.
