= Emil Stoev (footballer, born 1986) =

Bulgarian footballer

Personal information
- Full name: Emil Dimitrov Stoev
- Date of birth: 15 March 1986 (age 40)
- Place of birth: Plovdiv, Bulgaria
- Height: 1.85 m (6 ft 1 in)
- Position: Forward

Team information
- Current team: Dimitrovgrad
- Number: 7

Senior career*
Years	Team	Apps	(Gls)
2005–2006	Spartak Plovdiv	33	(5)
2007	Botev Plovdiv	6	(0)
2007–2008	Maritsa Plovdiv	21	(11)
2008	Rodopa Smolyan	8	(0)
2009	Maritsa Plovdiv	11	(2)
2009	Lokomotiv Plovdiv	5	(0)
2010	Minyor Radnevo	10	(2)
2010	Vidima-Rakovski	7	(0)
2011–	Dimitrovgrad		
- * Club domestic league appearances and goals as of 14 February 2011

Emil Stoev (Bulgarian: Емил Стоев; born 15 March 1986) is a Bulgarian football player who plays as a forward.
