= Stefano Kunchev =

Bulgarian footballer

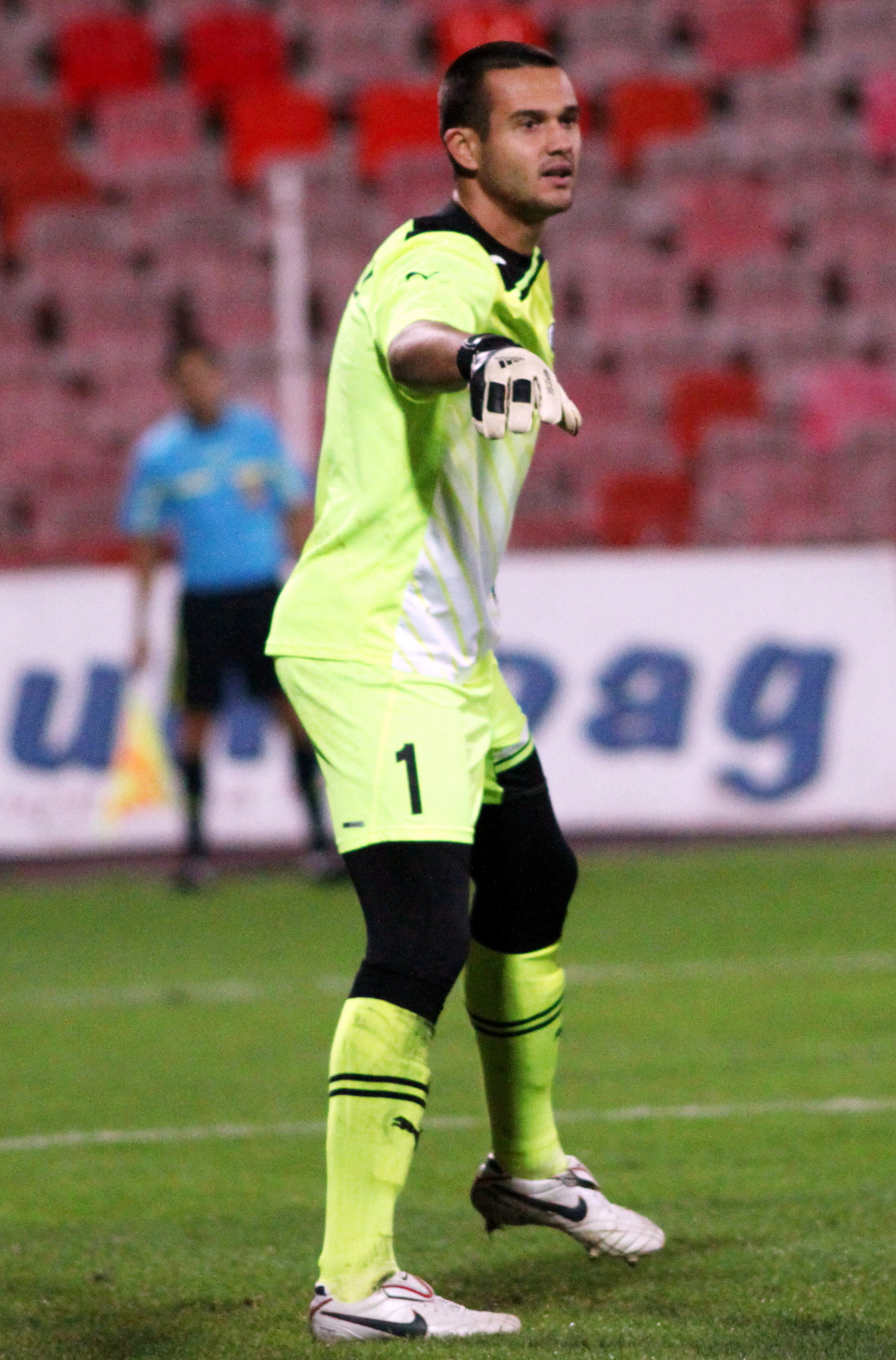

Personal information
- Full name: Stefano Krasimirov Kunchev
- Date of birth: 20 April 1991 (age 35)
- Place of birth: Troyan, Bulgaria
- Height: 1.92 m (6 ft 4 in)
- Position: Goalkeeper

Youth career
- Vekta Plovdiv

Senior career*
Years	Team	Apps	(Gls)
2008–2009	Lokomotiv Plovdiv	1	(0)
2009	Lokomotiv Mezdra	0	(0)
2010–2013	Slavia Sofia	55	(0)
2012	→ Lokomotiv Plovdiv (loan)	8	(0)
2014	Chernomorets Burgas	3	(0)
2014	Levski Sofia	3	(0)
2014–2015	Trikala	21	(0)
2016	Egersunds IK	10	(0)
2016–2017	Lokomotiv GO	5	(0)
2017–2018	Vihren Sandanski	64	(1)
2019	Dobrudzha Dobrich	12	(0)
2019	Atlantas	4	(0)
2020–2023	Sportist Svoge	59	(0)

International career
2010–2012	Bulgaria U21	15	(0)
- * Club domestic league appearances and goals as of 25 September 2024

Stefano Kunchev (Bulgarian: Стефано Кунчев; born 20 April 1991) is a Bulgarian footballer who plays as a goalkeeper.

== Career ==
His first club was FC Vekta. Kunchev made his debut in professional football as a 17-year-old for Lokomotiv Plovdiv. He signed with Levski Sofia in 2014, but was released after making only a few appearances for the team following a goalkeeping mistake made in a match against Beroe. He subsequently relocated to Greece.

Kunchev played for Lokomotiv Gorna Oryahovitsa one season but left the club in June 2017. On 11 August 2017, he joined Vihren Sandanski.

== International career ==
In January, 2010, the Bulgarian national under-21 coach Mihail Madanski called Kunchev in the Bulgaria national under-21 football team for the friendly tournament Albena Cup.
