= Deyan Ivanov =

Bulgarian footballer

Personal information
- Full name: Deyan Viktorov Ivanov
- Date of birth: 12 April 1996 (age 30)
- Place of birth: Sofia, Bulgaria
- Height: 1.86 m (6 ft 1 in)
- Position: Centre back

Youth career
- 2003–2011: Levski-Rakovski
- 2011–2014: Levski Sofia

Senior career*
Years	Team	Apps	(Gls)
2014–2020	Levski Sofia	16	(0)
2017–2018	→ Botev Vratsa (loan)	29	(3)
2019–2020	→ Botev Vratsa (loan)	10	(0)
2020–2021	Lokomotiv Sofia	8	(0)
2021	Sportist Svoge	2	(0)
- * Club domestic league appearances and goals

Deyan Ivanov (Bulgarian: Деян Иванов; born 12 April 1996) is a former Bulgarian professional footballer who played as a centre back.

== Career ==
Ivanov made his league debut for Levski against Marek Dupnitsa during the 2014–15 campaign. Levski won 6–0 and Ivanov played the full 90 minutes on the pitch.

In October 2015 he suffered a severe injury that took him out for a year and a half. After a recovery in Italy, he signed a new 3-year contract with Levski Sofia

In July 2017, he was loaned to Second League club Botev Vratsa. In the last match of the season, Ivanov scored the winning goal in the 89th minute which secured Botev's first place in the league and the promotion to first league.
