= Miguel Bedoya =

Spanish professional footballer

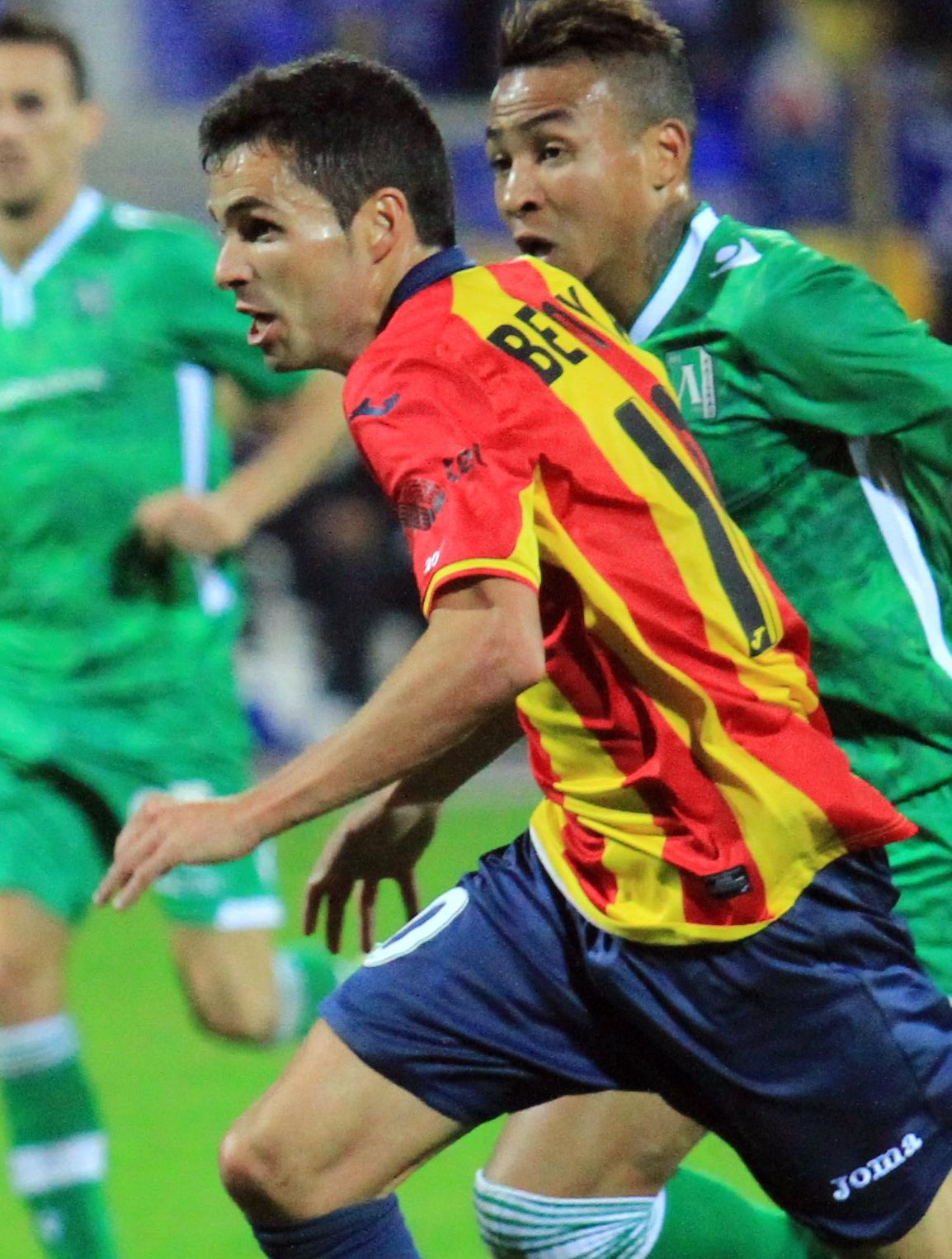
- Bedoya in action for Levski Sofia in 2014

Personal information
- Full name: Miguel Bedoya Sequeiros
- Date of birth: 15 April 1986 (age 40)
- Place of birth: Madrid, Spain
- Height: 1.74 m (5 ft 8 1/2 in)
- Position: Attacking midfielder

Youth career
- Rayo Majadahonda

Senior career*
Years	Team	Apps	(Gls)
2005–2007	Rayo Majadahonda	53	(13)
2007–2011	Getafe B	145	(34)
2011–2014	Numancia	103	(4)
2014–2016	Levski Sofia	59	(14)
2016–2018	Apollon Limassol	28	(1)
Total		388	(66)
- * Club domestic league appearances and goals

Miguel Bedoya Sequeiros (born 15 April 1986) is a Spanish former professional footballer who played as an attacking midfielder.

== Club career ==
=== Spain ===
Born in Madrid, Bedoya only played lower league and amateur football until the age of 25, representing local CF Rayo Majadahonda and Getafe CF B. He helped the latter team promote to Segunda División B for the first time ever, in 2010.

On 23 May 2011, Bedoya joined CD Numancia on a three-year contract. He played his first game as a professional on 4 September that year, coming on as a late substitute in a 0–0 away draw against Gimnàstic de Tarragona in the Segunda División.

In his last season in Soria, Bedoya started in 22 of his 31 appearances, helping to a final 13th position.

=== Bulgaria ===
On 8 July 2014, Bedoya signed a two-year deal with Bulgarian club PFC Levski Sofia. His first appearance in the First Professional Football League occurred 11 days later, as he started in a 1–1 home draw against PFC Lokomotiv Plovdiv. He scored his first goals for his new team on 27 September, his brace helping to a 3–2 derby defeat of PFC Ludogorets Razgrad at the Georgi Asparuhov Stadium.

== Career statistics ==
As of 12 February 2017

Club performance			League		Cup		Continental		Other		Total	
Club	League	Season	Apps	Goals	Apps	Goals	Apps	Goals	Apps	Goals	Apps	Goals
Spain			League		Copa del Rey		Europe		Other		Total	
Numancia	Segunda División	2011–12	38	3	2	0	–		–		40	3
Numancia	Segunda División	2012–13	34	1	1	0	–		–		35	1
Numancia	Segunda División	2013–14	31	0	1	0	–		–		32	0
Numancia	Total		103	4	4	0	0	0	0	0	107	4
Bulgaria			League		Bulgarian Cup		Europe		Other		Total	
Levski Sofia	A Group	2014–15	30	8	6	1	–		–		36	9
Levski Sofia	A Group	2015–16	29	6	3	1	–		–		32	7
Levski Sofia	Total		59	14	9	2	0	0	0	0	68	16
Cyprus			League		Cypriot Cup		Europe		Other		Total	
Apollon Limassol	Cypriot First Division	2016–17	18	1	3	0	2 (Note: Appearances in UEFA Europa League)	0	1	0	24	1
Apollon Limassol	Cypriot First Division	2017–18	0	0	0	0	0	0	0	0	0	0
Apollon Limassol	Total		18	1	3	0	2	0	1	0	24	1
Career statistics			180	19	16	2	2	0	1	0	199	21
