= Tihomir Trifonov =

Bulgarian footballer

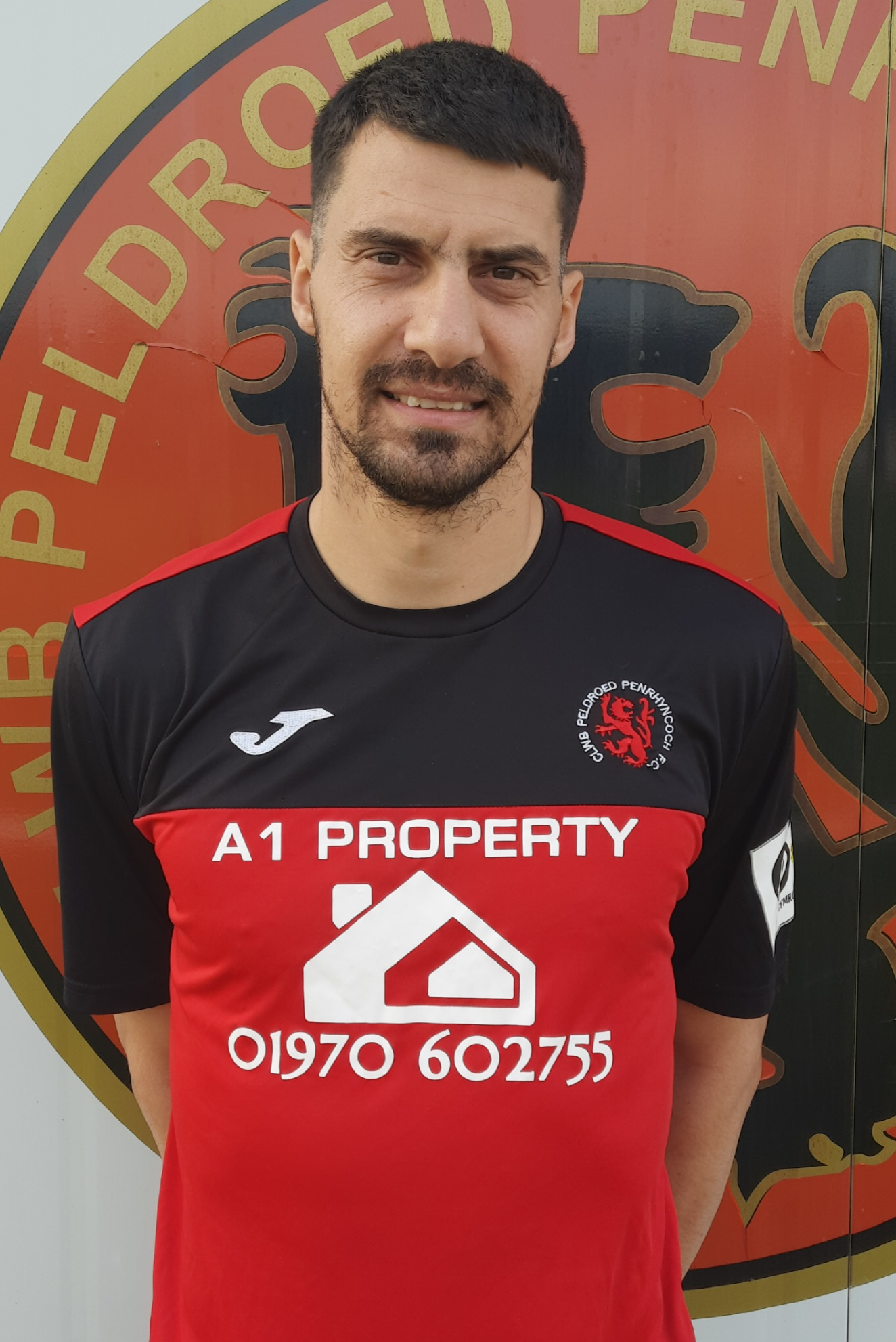
- Trifonov with Penrhyncoch in 2021

Personal information
- Full name: Tihomir Nikolaev Trifonov
- Date of birth: 25 November 1986 (age 39)
- Place of birth: Veliko Tarnovo, Bulgaria
- Height: 1.91 m (6 ft 3 in)
- Position: Centre back

Youth career
- Etar; Litex

Senior career*
| Years | Team | Apps | (Gls) |
| 2005–2007 | Dunav Ruse | 23 | (0) |
| 2007–2009 | Lokomotiv Mezdra | 27 | (1) |
| 2009–2012 | Montana | 80 | (1) |
| 2012 | Etar 1924 | 12 | (0) |
| 2012–2013 | Chernomorets Burgas | 1 | (0) |
| 2014 | Lokomotiv Plovdiv | 7 | (0) |
| 2014 | Etar | 8 | (1) |
| 2015 | Haskovo | 12 | (1) |
| 2015–2016 | Neftochimic | 24 | (0) |
| 2016 | Montana | 11 | (0) |
| 2017 | Zaria Bălți | 13 | (1) |
| 2018 | Sevlievo | ? | (?) |
| 2018–2019 | Lokomotiv GO | 24 | (1) |
| 2020–2021 | Sevlievo | 0 | (0) |
| 2021–2023 | Penrhyncoch | 31 | (2) |
- * Club domestic league appearances and goals as of 28 April 2022

Tihomir Nikolaev Trifonov (Bulgarian: Тихомир Николаев Трифонов; born 25 November 1986) is a Bulgarian former professional footballer who played as a defender. He had spells in Bulgaria, Moldova and Wales.

== Personal life ==
Trifonov has two children. He currently resides in Aberystwyth, Wales.

== Career ==
His teammates call him "Hero" because of its similarity with Dimitar Dimitrov – Hero. Litex Lovech signed his first professional contract, but never recorded an official match for the first team. In 2006, along with youth adolescents he is disposed of Litex River (Montana) where the head coach at the time is Ferario Spasov. Trifonov played 23 games, the team from the relegation zone ends at the fifth place. Before the start of the 2006–07 season was then sold to the elite Lokomotiv (Mezdra) which is liked by the then sports director George Bachev. In 2009, Montana passed which played 80 matches in group A for three seasons. In the summer of 2012 with an option to continue his career in Poland, but after she failed to sign two years with the elite rookie Etar Veliko Tarnovo [2] Tsanko Tsvetanov coach a vote of confidence and even makes the team captain.

Trifonov started to play football by Etar Veliko Tarnovo, where Litex Lovech scouted him, and signed him for the youth-team. He made his debut in professional football, being part of the Dunav Rousse squad in the 2005–06 season in second division.

In June 2007 joined to Lokomotiv Mezdra and was promoted to the top division with the team. In season 2008–09, Trifonov earned 12 appearances playing in the A PFG.

On 24 July 2009 Montana signed Trifonov to a three-year deal. He made his competitive debut for Montana on 8 August 2009 against Sliven 2000 in the first round of the A PFG.

On 4 July 2012 Trifonov signed a two-year deal with Etar Veliko Tarnovo, which was his youth team. His first official match for Etar Veliko Tarnovo was on 12 August 2012 against Montana where Etar Veliko Tarnovo won by a score of 3:2. On 29 November 2012 Trifonov signed a two-year and a half deal with Chernomorets Burgas. His contract was terminated mutually by his request on 30 June 2013 due to heavy injures.

On 22 January 2017, Trifonov joined Moldovan club Zaria Bălți.

In June 2018, Trifonov joined Lokomotiv Gorna Oryahovitsa.

In June 2021, Trifonov moved to Wales and joined Cymru North side Penrhyncoch
