= Bojan Jorgačević =

Serbian footballer (born 1982)

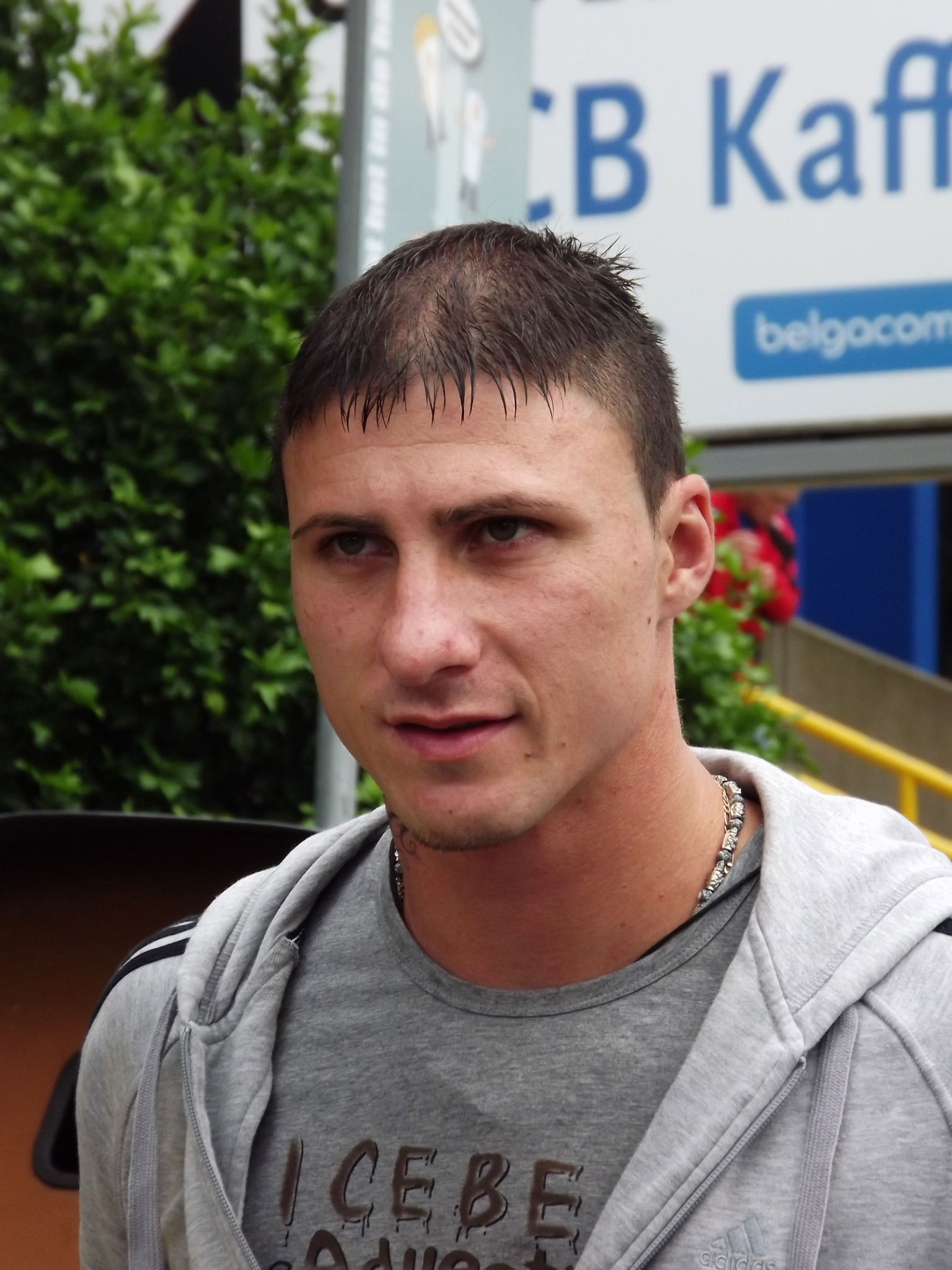
- Jorgačević in 2012

Personal information
- Date of birth: 12 February 1982 (age 44)
- Place of birth: Belgrade, SFR Yugoslavia
- Height: 1.87 m (6 ft 2 in)
- Position: Goalkeeper

Youth career
- –2002: Rad Belgrade

Senior career*
Years	Team	Apps	(Gls)
2002–2007	Rad Belgrade	102	(0)
2003	→ Dinamo Pančevo (loan)	17	(0)
2007–2011	Gent	145	(1)
2011–2013	Club Brugge	38	(0)
2013–2014	Kayseri Erciyesspor	19	(0)
2015–2017	Levski Sofia	64	(0)
Total		385	(1)

International career
2010–2011	Serbia	7	(0)

Managerial career
- 2023–2024: Sarajevo (goalkeeping coach)
- * Club domestic league appearances and goals

Bojan Jorgačević (Serbian Cyrillic: Бојан Јоргачевић, born 12 February 1982) is a Serbian retired football goalkeeper and current goalkeeping coach.

== Career ==
Born in Belgrade, Jorgačević began his career in his home town with FK Rad.

=== Gent ===
Jorgačević got in 2007–08 season the difficult task to replace the club-icon of that time, Frédéric Herpoel, who had been the keeper of KAA Gent during the ten last years. In the first game of the season, which was his first year at KAA Gent, his competitor Alexandre Martinović started in the goal. But that particular game Martinović didn't make a good impression and as from the second game until the end of the season Jorgačević was the keeper of the team. He helped to win many points and got much support from the fans and the team.

As from the start of the 2008–09 season, Jorgačević was, together with Bryan Ruiz, a real principal player in the team. He got such a good performance that he became quickly a public's favourite in Gent. He underscored this thrust by stating in a weekly magazine that he wants to become a memorial player in the team of AA Ghent. The season was very successful and Jorgačević signed a contract in Gent until 2012.

The 2009–10 season was the best in club history (up until the 2014-15 championship). AA Gent ended on the second spot in the Jupiler Pro League (after successful play-offs) and it won also the Belgian Cup. Jorgačević was once again one of the main players of the team. He formed with the central defensive players Šuler and Wils a strong defence. By consequence his position as first keeper was never in danger. Jorgačević also got the opportunity to play in European competitions, but he couldn't reach the position of First national keeper of Serbia, as Vladimir Stojković occupies this position. As this keeper got a less period at the end of 2010, Jorgačević made his debut in the Serbia national team on 17 November 2010 and took every ball which threatened his goal. On 10 August 2011. He started as a goalkeeper against Russia in a friendly match for his 3rd time in the National team

On 19 May 2011, Bojan resigned a contract of 2 years in Gent up to 2013, making it seem he was to stay longer at Gent.

=== Brugge ===
However, later that year rivals Club Brugge needed a keeper urgently and therefore signed Jorgačević during the season until 2016.

=== Levski Sofia ===
On 6 January 2015, Jorgačević signed a one-and-a-half-year contract with Bulgarian side Levski Sofia. He made his A Group debut for the club on 14 March, keeping a clean sheet in a 4–0 win over Marek Dupnitsa at Georgi Asparuhov Stadium.

Jorgačević signed a two-year extension to his current contract with Levski on 26 November 2015, keeping him at the club until at least the end of the 2017–18 season.

After the managerial changes during the 2016-17 season, and also a serious injury, Bojan lost his place in the team which led to his contract being terminated, and, consequently, to his retirement. As a result, on 6 September 2017, before the kickoff of the match Levski-Ludogorets, Jorgačević gave an emotional goodbye to the club, with 16,000 fans applauding him and chanting his name.

== International career ==
In November 2010, Jorgačević was called up to the Serbia squad, for their friendly fixture against Bulgaria. He made his debut, playing full 90 minutes in a 1–0 away win at Vasil Levski National Stadium in Sofia on 17 November.

In the following year, he played in four Euro 2012 qualifiers against Northern Ireland, Faroe Islands, Italy and Slovenia, keeping one clean sheet at Windsor Park in Belfast on 2 September 2011. He conceded a first half stoppage time goal by Dare Vršič, from a free-kick taken about 40 meters away from goal, which ended in a 1-0 defeat against Slovenia. That proved to be his final international game.

== Career statistics ==
=== National team ===
Serbia national team
Year	Apps	Goals
2010	1	0
2011	6	0
Total	7	0

== Honours ==
Gent

- Belgian Cup: 2009–10
