= Luís Pedro (footballer, born 1990) =

Dutch footballer

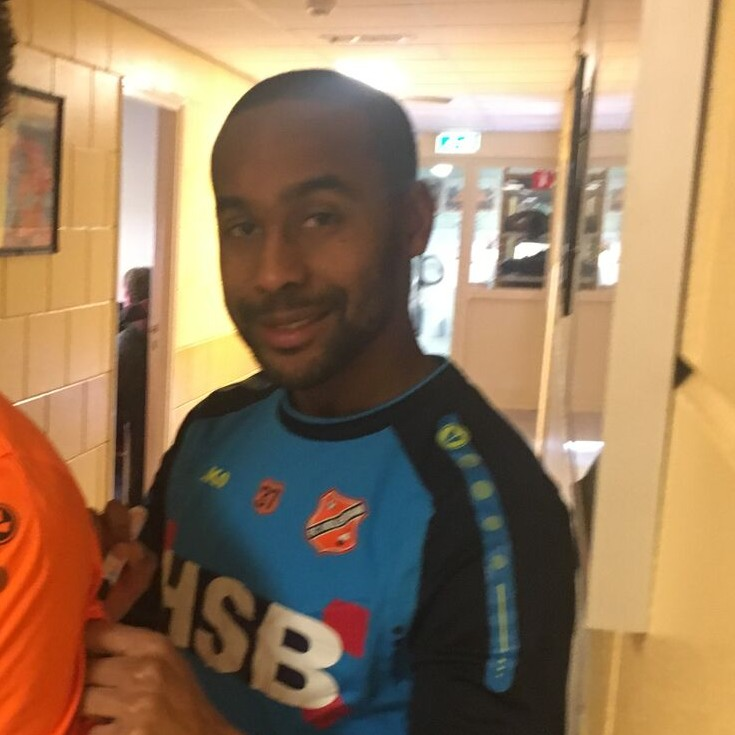
- Pedro in 2018

Personal information
- Date of birth: 27 April 1990 (age 36)
- Place of birth: Luanda, Angola
- Height: 1.75 m (5 ft 9 in)
- Positions: Winger; forward

Youth career
- MVV
- 2006–2008: Feyenoord

Senior career*
Years	Team	Apps	(Gls)
2008–2010	Feyenoord	9	(0)
2009–2010	→ Excelsior (loan)	20	(10)
2010–2011	Go Ahead Eagles	29	(15)
2011–2013	Heracles Almelo	29	(2)
2013–2014	Botev Plovdiv	34	(6)
2014–2015	Levski Sofia	23	(3)
2015–2016	Târgu Mureș	17	(1)
2016	Carlisle United	1	(0)
2016–2017	MVV	29	(1)
2017–2018	Volendam	20	(1)
2019	Lienden	8	(0)
2019–2020	TEC	3	(0)
2021–2022	FC Nitra		
2022	Ilirija 1911	10	(2)

International career
	Netherlands U18	1	(1)
2008–2009	Netherlands U19	8	(3)
- * Club domestic league appearances and goals as of 13:47, 15 January 2026 (UTC)

Luís Pedro (born 27 April 1990) is a Dutch professional footballer who plays as a winger. He has also played club football in the Netherlands, Bulgaria, Romania, and England.

== Career ==
=== Club career ===
Born in Luanda, Angola, Pedro began his career with MVV Maastricht and moved to Feyenoord in 2006. He was the top goalscorer for the reserve team in the 2007–08 season. Pedro spent the 2009–10 season on loan at SBV Excelsior.

After first relocating to Bulgaria in 2013 to play for Botev Plovdiv, he signed a two-year contract with Levski Sofia in July 2014.

Pedro joined Carlisle United on 24 March 2016 until the end of the 2015–16 season. After being part of the ranks of MVV Maastricht, in June 2017 Pedro signed a contract with FC Volendam for one season (with the option for an additional one).

=== International career ===
Pedro is a youth player for Netherlands having represented them at under-18 and under-19 levels.

== Personal life ==
Pedro is son of a Portuguese father and an Angolan mother, although he holds a Dutch passport.

== Honours ==
=== Club ===
ASA Târgu Mureș

- Romanian Supercup: 2015
