= Emil Ninu =

Romanian footballer

Personal information
- Full name: Emil Ducu Ninu
- Date of birth: 28 August 1986 (age 40)
- Place of birth: Craiova, Romania
- Height: 1.82 m (6 ft 0 in)
- Positions: Centre-back; right-back; left-back

Team information
- Current team: Venus Independența
- Number: 19

Youth career
- 1995–2002: CSŞ Craiova
- 2003–2005: Şcoala de Fotbal Gică Popescu

Senior career*
Years	Team	Apps	(Gls)
2005–2007	Naţional București	16	(0)
2007–2010	Steaua București	6	(0)
2008	→ Gloria Buzău (loan)	20	(0)
2008–2009	→ Gloria Bistriţa (loan)	6	(0)
2010	→ Farul Constanţa (loan)	11	(2)
2010–2012	Viitorul Constanţa	23	(0)
2013–2014	Universitatea Cluj	56	(1)
2015	Levski Sofia	9	(1)
2015–2016	AEK Larnaca	19	(0)
2016–2017	Hapoel Bnei Lod	30	(2)
2017–2018	Maccabi Ahi Nazareth	29	(0)
2018	Energeticianul	8	(0)
2019–	Venus Independența	59	(1)

International career
2006–2007	Romania U21	12	(0)
- * Club domestic league appearances and goals as of 17:46, 31 October 2018 (UTC)

Emil Ducu Ninu (born 28 August 1986) is a Romanian footballer who plays as a defender for Liga IV side Venus Independența.

== Club career ==
On 16 July 2009, Ninu made his European competition debut for Steaua in the UEFA Europa League against Újpest FC. On 12 January 2015, he signed with Levski Sofia in the A PFG, but did not establish himself as a starter and left the team later that year.
