= Vladislav Misyak =

Bulgarian footballer

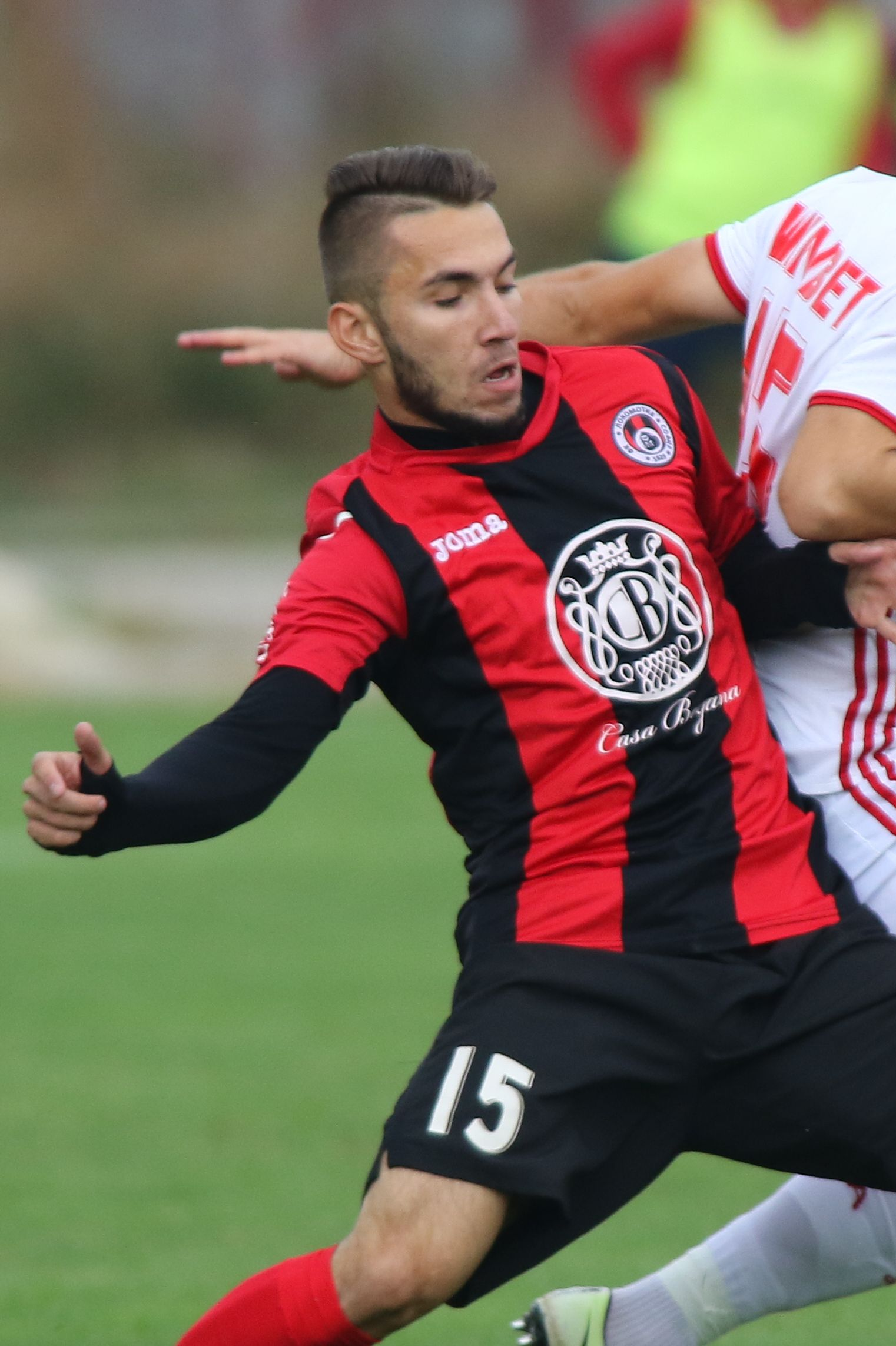

Personal information
- Full name: Vladislav Sergeev Misyak
- Date of birth: July 15, 1995 (age 31)
- Place of birth: Kyustendil, Bulgaria
- Height: 1.75 m (5 ft 9 in)
- Position: Winger

Team information
- Current team: Boruna Tsareva Livada
- Number: 22

Youth career
- –2008: FC Buzludzha
- 2008–2014: Levski Sofia

Senior career*
| Years | Team | Apps | (Gls) |
| 2014–2015 | Levski Sofia | 17 | (1) |
| 2016 | Neftochimic Burgas | 3 | (0) |
| 2016–2017 | Lokomotiv Sofia | 27 | (4) |
| 2017–2018 | Arda Kardzhali | 31 | (11) |
| 2018–2019 | Montana | 23 | (0) |
| 2020–2022 | Yantra Gabrovo | 23 | (0) |
| 2022– | Boruna Tsareva Livada | | (0) |

International career
| 2013 | Bulgaria U19 | 1 | (3) |
- * Club domestic league appearances and goals as of 12 August 2022

Vladislav Misyak (Bulgarian: Владислав Мисяк; born 15 July 1995) is a Bulgarian footballer currently playing as a winger for Boruna Tsareva Livada.

== Career ==
=== Levski Sofia ===
Born in Kyustendil, Misyak began playing football at the local club FC Buzludzha, before joining Levski Sofia at the age of 13.

He made his first team debut in a 2–0 league win over Botev Plovdiv on 22 March 2014.

=== Neftochimic Burgas ===
On 11 January 2016 he signed for B Group team Neftochimic Burgas.

=== Arda Kardzhali ===
On 21 June 2017, after a season in Lokomotiv Sofia, he joined Third League club Arda Kardzhali.

=== Yantra Gabrovo ===
In January 2020, Misyak moved to Yantra Gabrovo 2019.

== Statistics ==
As of 20 December 2015

| Club performance | | | League | | Cup | | Continental | | Other | | Total | |
| Club | League | Season | Apps | Goals | Apps | Goals | Apps | Goals | Apps | Goals | Apps | Goals |
| Bulgaria | | | League | | Bulgarian Cup | | Europe | | Other (Note: Includes Bulgarian Supercup matches.) | | Total | |
|---|---|---|---|---|---|---|---|---|---|---|---|---|
| Levski Sofia | A Group | 2013–14 | 9 | 1 | 0 | 0 | – | | – | | 9 | 1 |
| Levski Sofia | A Group | 2014–15 | 5 | 0 | 2 | 1 | – | | – | | 7 | 1 |
| Levski Sofia | A Group | 2015–16 | 3 | 0 | 1 | 0 | – | | – | | 4 | 0 |
| Levski Sofia | Total | | 17 | 1 | 3 | 1 | 0 | 0 | 0 | 0 | 20 | 2 |
| Career statistics | | | 17 | 1 | 3 | 1 | 0 | 0 | 0 | 0 | 20 | 2 |
