= Aleksandar Lyubenov =

Bulgarian footballer

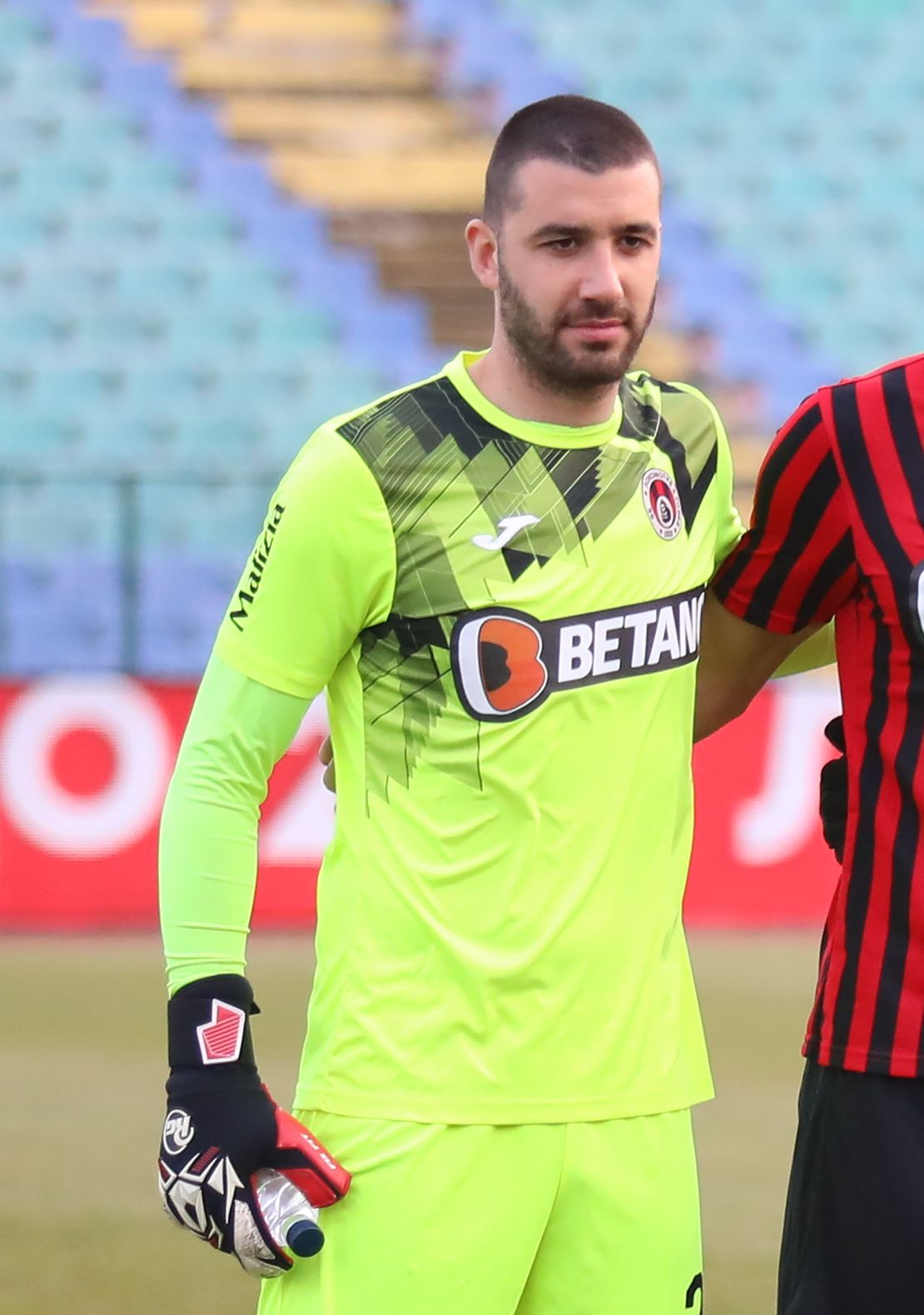

Personal information
- Full name: Aleksandar Kirilov Lyubenov
- Date of birth: 11 February 1995 (age 31)
- Place of birth: Bankya, Bulgaria
- Height: 1.87 m (6 ft 1 1/2 in)
- Position: Goalkeeper

Team information
- Current team: Lokomotiv Sofia
- Number: 24

Youth career
- Levski Sofia

Senior career*
Years	Team	Apps	(Gls)
2014–2016	Levski Sofia	2	(0)
2015	→ Septemvri Simitli (loan)	10	(0)
2016–2017	Lokomotiv Plovdiv	0	(0)
2016–2017	→ Lokomotiv Sofia (loan)	26	(0)
2017–2019	Levski Sofia	2	(0)
2018	→ Botev Vratsa (loan)	5	(0)
2018–2019	→ Lokomotiv Sofia (loan)	29	(0)
2019–2021	Hebar	39	(0)
2021–	Lokomotiv Sofia	126	(0)

International career
2013–2014	Bulgaria U19	9	(0)
2015–2016	Bulgaria U21	1	(0)
- * Club domestic league appearances and goals as of 11 June 2026

Aleksandar Kirilov Lyubenov (Bulgarian: Александър Кирилов Любенов; born 11 February 1995) is a Bulgarian footballer who plays as a goalkeeper for Lokomotiv Sofia.

At international level, Lyubenov captained the U-19 Bulgarian national team at the Euro 2014 in Hungary.

== Career ==
Born in Bankya, part of Greater Sofia, Lyubenov began playing football for local side Levski Sofia. He grew through all youth garnitures in the club.

Lyubenov made his first team debut in a 2–1 league home win against Botev Plovdiv on 17 August 2014.

After short spells with Septemvri Simitli, Lokomotiv Plovdiv and Lokomotiv Sofia, on 12 June 2017, Lyubenov signed a 3-year contract with his hometown club Levski Sofia.

== Career statistics ==
=== Club ===
As of 10 June 2017

Club performance			League		Cup		Continental		Other		Total	
Club	League	Season	Apps	Goals	Apps	Goals	Apps	Goals	Apps	Goals	Apps	Goals
Bulgaria			League		CCB Cup		Europe		Other (Note: Includes Bulgarian Supercup matches.)		Total	
Levski Sofia	A Group	2014–15	2	0	0	0	–		–		2	0
Septemvri Simitli (loan)	B Group	2014–15	10	0	0	0	–		–		10	0
Levski Sofia	A Group	2015–16	0	0	0	0	–		–		0	0
Levski Sofia	Total		2	0	0	0	0	0	0	0	2	0
Lokomotiv Plovdiv	First League	2016–17	0	0	0	0	–		–		0	0
Lokomotiv Sofia (loan)	Second League	2016–17	26	0	2	0	–		–		28	0
Career statistics			38	0	2	0	0	0	0	0	40	0
