= Stadion Georgi Asparuhov =

Football stadium in Sofia, Bulgaria

Georgi Asparuhov Stadium
- Стадион Георги Аспарухов
- Герена (Gerena)
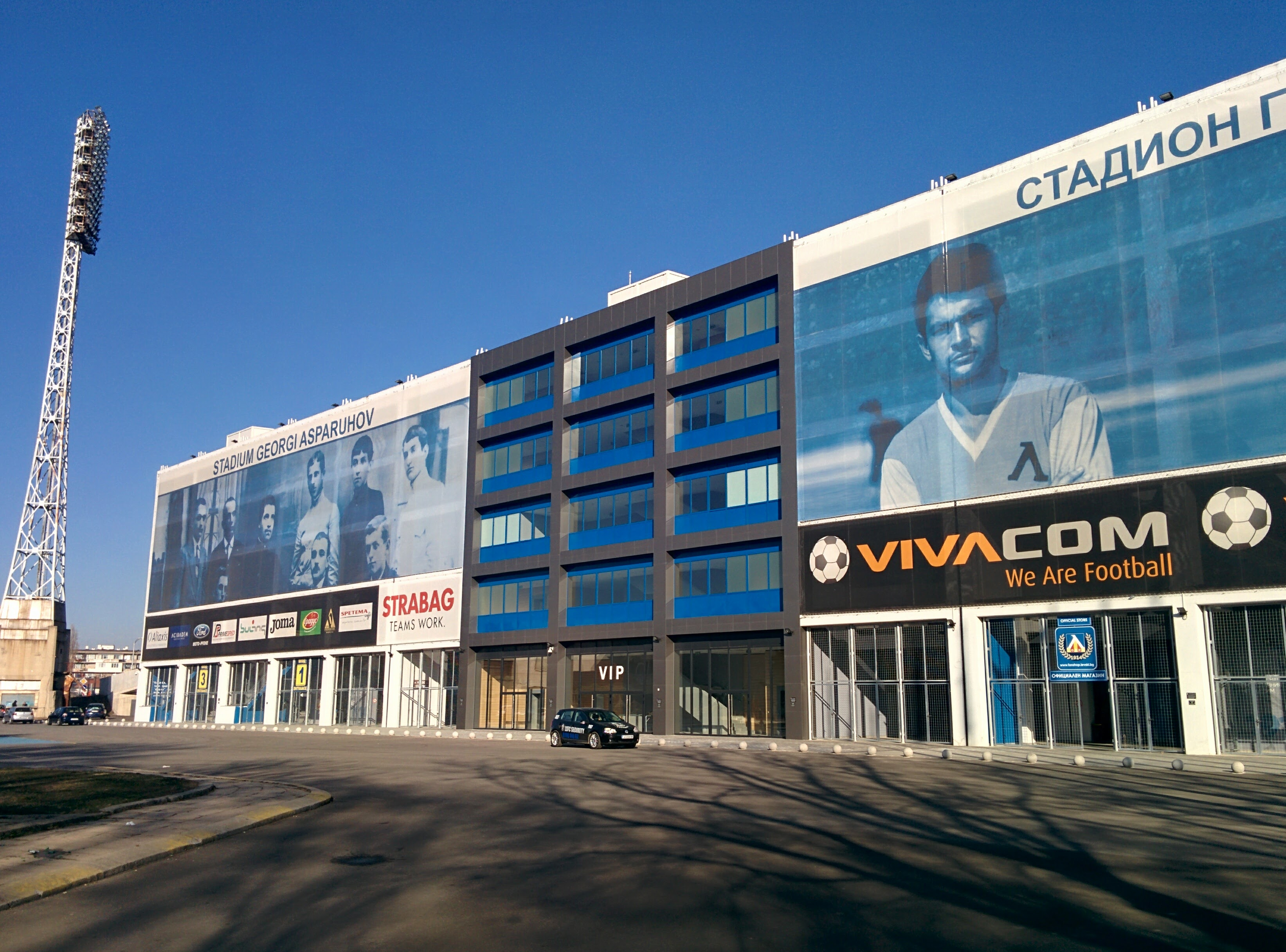
- UEFA Category 3 Stadium
- Interactive map of Georgi Asparuhov Stadium
- Former names: Levski Stadium (1963–1990); Vivacom Arena - Georgi Asparuhov (2017–2024)
- Address: 47 Todorini Kukli Str. 1517 Sofia
- Location: Sofia, Bulgaria
- Coordinates: 42°42′20″N 23°21′48″E
- Owner: Sofia Municipality
- Operator: PFC Levski Sofia
- Capacity: 17,688
- Surface: Grass
- Field size: 105 m × 68 m (344 ft × 223 ft)
- Parking: Yes

Construction
- Groundbreaking: 1960; 66 years ago
- Opened: 10 March 1963; 63 years ago
- Renovated: 1999; 27 years ago, 2016; 10 years ago
- Architect: Lazar Parashkevanov

Tenant
- PFC Levski Sofia (1963–present)

Georgi Asparuhov Stadium (Bulgarian: Стадион „Георги Аспарухов“), nicknamed Gerena (Bulgarian: Герена, meaning "the flood plain"), is a multi-purpose stadium situated in the Suhata reka neighbourhood of the Bulgarian capital Sofia. Named after the legendary Bulgarian footballer Georgi Asparuhov (1943–1971), it has been the home ground of Bulgarian association football club Levski Sofia since its opening in 1963.

== History ==
=== Origin ===
Levski Sofia previously played their home matches at two different stadiums before the construction of their current stadium. Between 1936 and 1949 the club had its own football ground which was named Igrishte Levski (Levski Football Field; Bulgarian: Игрище „Левски“) and it was situated in the city centre at the place of the current Vasil Levski National Stadium. As the construction of a new national stadium emerged in the early 1950s, Levski Sofia was eventually relocated to the Yunak Stadium and began sharing it with several other football clubs. In the following years, the football club was once again relocated to use another field in the capital, most notably a football ground in the Ivan Vazov neighbourhood of Sofia at the place of the current Spartak Swimming Complex.

=== Construction and early years ===
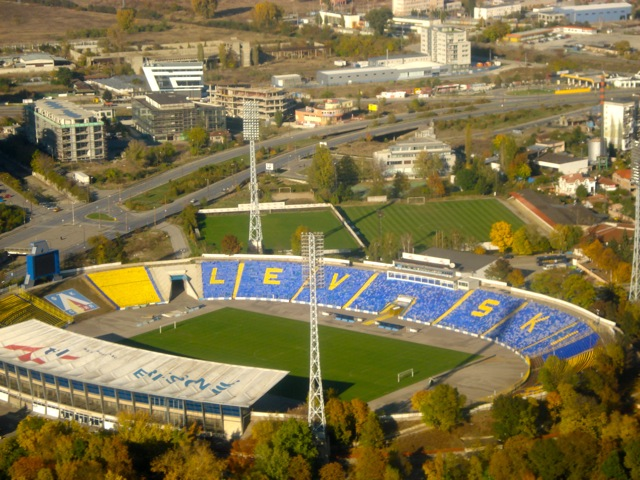
Aerial view before the Sector A stand reconstruction

The new football scoreboard at the club's stadium

In the late 1950s the club was granted a site where a new stadium could be built. The construction started in 1960 and the new stadium, designed by Lazar Parashkevanov, was built in three years. Its official name was Levski Stadium (Stadion Levski; Bulgarian: Стадион „Левски“) but it was dubbed Gerena by the supporters after the name of the neighbourhood in which it was built. The ground was opened on 10 March 1963 when Levski Sofia hosted a Bulgarian championship match against Spartak Pleven, winning 4-0. The stadium then had a grass field with dimensions 110 х 80 m, an athletics track, seating capacity of 38,000 and additional terraces for standing spectators. The main stand of the stadium was covered.

Many reconstructions of the stadium started in 1969 after the unification of the sport and football clubs Levski Sofia and Spartak Sofia. New sport facilities were built inside and around the stadium turning it into a multi-use one hosting other sports events including gymnastics, boxing, weightlifting and volleyball. A training ground with four grass pitches was also built to the east of the stadium.

In 1986, a scoreboard was installed above the north stand of the stadium and four floodlight pylons were erected.

In 1990, the stadium was renamed after the legendary forward of the club Georgi Asparuhov who died in a car accident in 1971. Today a monument of Georgi Asparuhov is erected next to the official entrance of the main stand.

=== Conversion to all-seater ===
In 1992, the stadium was closed for a major reconstruction that would redevelop the venue into an all-seater one, eventually allowing international football matches to be played there. During the redevelopment, the football club played its home matches at the Vasil Levski National Stadium. The stadium's reconstruction however was delayed several times between 1993 and 1997 following the economic hyperinflation crisis in Bulgaria. In 1998, a stadium development fund was established with the endorsement of Levski Sofia's supporters to finance the stadium's refurbishment. The reconstruction of the stadium finally ended in 1999, and the venue was officially opened on May 5, 1999 for Levski Sofia's decisive league match against Litex Lovech, which ended in a 0-0 draw. The athletics track was also removed in order for the dimensions of the field to be expanded. With all stands rebuilt to all-seater ones, the capacity of the stadium was eventually reduced to 29,500 seats.

=== Recent redevelopment ===
In 2006, a new scoreboard was installed in a frame with the shape of the Cyrillic letter L (Л), signifying the symbol of Levski Sofia. At the end of 2007, the grass surface was also replaced and new sprinkler, drainage and heating systems were installed.

In 2011, plans for a full redevelopment of the stadium emerged. Between February and May 2011 the away supporters stand was refurbished following vandalism during the Eternal derby of Bulgarian football. In the summer break of 2011, a similar refurbishment was done to the Sector B ultras stand. Further plans included an initial reconstruction of Sector V stand, after which the central Sector A stand would be demolished and newly constructed.

In December 2012, the club officials presented a redevelopment project for the stadium. Initially planned to be executed in three stages, starting with Sector A, with the estimated capacity of the venue after full reconstruction was expected to be between 28,000 and 30,000.

In February 2013, Sector A stand was demolished and the construction of a new stand on its location started on 5 July 2013. The new redeveloped stand had to become the main stand of the stadium, featuring parking areas, dressing rooms, media facilities and seats, VIP areas, TV camera facilities. The capacity of the new stand was planned to be 6,000 and it was planned to be finished for Levski's 100th anniversary in May 2014.

On 23 April 2016, after several delays, the new stand was finally opened for Levski's domestic match against Ludogorets Razgrad. A presentation of Levski's official fan store was also held and opened during the same day. During the opening, Levski officials also announced that the other stands will also be rebuilt in the following years as soon as funding is found.

In April 2026, in collaboration with Bulgarian architectural company IPA, Levski announced a €120 million redevelopment project for the stadium to upgrade it to UEFA Category 4 status. The upgrades would see capacity extended to approximately 25,000 (for football matches) and 40,000 (for other events), a new facade shell of perforated metal panels, completely renovated lighting, sound and video systems, and would also be designed as a multi-purpose venue to host other events such as concerts. Construction is set to begin in the spring of 2027 and take 2 years to complete. In September 2026, an updated version of the project was presented, which saw capacity for football matches increased to approximately 28,000, as well as introducing digital elements to the facade, and announcing a collaboration with German engineering firm Schlaich Bergermann Partner.

== Records ==
The stadium's record attendance is 60,000 spectators and was achieved twice - on March 4, 1970 when Levski Sofia hosted Polish club Górnik Zabrze in a 1969-70 European Cup Winners' Cup quarter-final match and in a 1973-74 A Group fixture against Pirin Blagoevgrad on September 16, 1973.

Levski Sofia holds the Bulgarian and European record for the longest unbeaten run at home stadium. Between October 1, 1966 and February 23, 1985 (18 years, 4 months and 22 days), the team was not defeated in 203 consecutive matches (note that during the period the matches between Sofia teams were all played at the Vasil Levski National Stadium).

== Technical data ==
The following information shows the stadium's technical data.

- Capacity: 25,000
- Media box: 130 seats
- Field dimensions: 105 m x 68 m
- Floodlights: 1,500 lx

== Concerts ==
Date	Performer(s)	Notes
29 May 2011	(Sweden) Roxette	The Neverending World Tour
7 June 2011	(United Kingdom) Sting	Symphonicity Tour
23 June 2016	(United Kingdom) (United States) Queen + Adam Lambert	Queen + Adam Lambert 2016 Summer Festival Tour
