= 2018–19 PFC Levski Sofia season =

Levski Sofia
2018–19 season
- Chairman: Spas Rusev (until 6 March 2019); Georgi Popov (since 6 March 2019)
- Manager: Delio Rossi (until 25 July 2018); Slaviša Stojanovič (until 21 Jan 2019); Georgi Dermendzhiev (until 29 Apr 2019)
- Stadium: Vivacom Arena - Georgi Asparuhov
- First League: 3rd
- Bulgarian Cup: Round of 16
- UEFA Europa League: First qualifying round
- Top goalscorer: League: Stanislav Kostov (24); All: Stanislav Kostov (24)
- Highest home attendance: 14,700 v. Ludogorets (10 March 2019)
- Lowest home attendance: 840 v. Dunav Ruse (1 December 2018)
- Average home league attendance: 5,350
- Biggest win: 7–0 v. Vereya (H)
- Biggest defeat: 1–3 v. Botev Vratsa (H)
Home colours	Away colours	Third colours

The 2018–19 season was Levski Sofia's 98th season in the First League. This article shows player statistics and all matches (official and friendly) that the club has played during the season.

== Transfers ==
=== In ===
No.	Pos.	Nat.	Name	Age	EU	Moving from	Type	Transfer window	Ends	Transfer fee	Source
1	GK	(Slovakia)	Martin Polaček	28	EU	(Czech Republic) Mladá Boleslav	Free transfer	Summer	2021	Free	Levski.bg
2	DF	(France)	Louis Nganioni	23	EU	(France) Lyon	Free transfer	Summer	2020	Free	Levski.bg
5	DF	(Iceland)	Hólmar Örn Eyjólfsson	27	EU	(Israel) Maccabi Haifa	Transfer	Summer	2021	500 000 €	mhaifafc.com
8	MF	(Switzerland)	Davide Mariani	27	EU	(Switzerland) Lugano	Free transfer	Summer	2021	Free	Levski.bg
14	MF	(Estonia)	Bogdan Vaštšuk	22	EU	(Latvia) Riga	Loan	Summer		Free	Levski.bg
22	DF	(Portugal)	Nuno Reis	27	EU	(Portugal) Vitória Setúbal	Transfer	Summer	2021	Undisclosed	Levski.bg
23	MF	(Senegal)	Khaly Thiam	24	Non-EU	(Hungary) MTK Budapest	Transfer	Summer	2021	300 000 €	sportal.bg
30	FW	(Bulgaria)	Iliya Dimitrov	21	EU	(Bulgaria) Lokomotiv Sofia	Loan return	Summer		Free	
39	DF	(Bulgaria)	Deyan Ivanov	22	EU	(Bulgaria) Botev Vratsa	Loan return	Summer		Free	
75	MF	(Bulgaria)	Aleks Borimirov	20	EU	(Bulgaria) Lokomotiv Sofia	Loan return	Summer		Free	
89	GK	(Bulgaria)	Nikolay Krastev	21	EU	(Bulgaria) Botev Vratsa	Loan return	Summer		Free	
93	MF	(Bulgaria)	Atanas Kabov	19	EU	(Bulgaria) Botev Vratsa	Loan return	Summer		Free	
96	FW	(Brazil)	Luan Viana	22	Non-EU	(United Arab Emirates) Shabab Al-Ahli	Free transfer	Summer		Free	Levski.bg
20	DF	(Bulgaria)	Zhivko Milanov	34	EU	(Cyprus) APOEL	Free transfer	Winter	2020	Free	Levski.bg
70	MF	(Bulgaria)	Martin Raynov	26	EU	(Bulgaria) Beroe	Transfer	Winter	2020	Undisclosed	Levski.bg
86	FW	(Bulgaria)	Valeri Bojinov	32	EU	(Bulgaria) Botev Vratsa	Free transfer	Winter	2020	Free	Levski.bg
17	FW	(Kazakhstan)	Yerkebulan Seydakhmet	19	Non-EU	(Russia) Ufa	Loan	Winter	2019	Free	Levski.bg
18	DF	(Benin)	Cédric Hountondji	25	EU	(United States) New York City	Free transfer	Winter	2019	Free	Levski.bg

=== Out ===
No.	Pos.	Nat.	Name	Age	EU	Moving to	Type	Transfer window	Transfer fee	Source
8	AM	(Bulgaria)	Antonio Vutov	22	EU	(Italy) Udinese	Loan return	Summer	Free	
13	MF	(Spain)	Jordi Gómez	33	EU	(Cyprus) Omonia	Released	Summer	Free	Levski.bg
15	MF	(Slovakia)	Roman Procházka	29	EU	(Czech Republic) Viktoria Plzeň	End of contract	Summer	Free	fcviktoria.cz
25	LB	(Portugal)	Afonso Figueiredo	25	EU	(France) Rennes	Loan return	Summer	Free	
30	MF	(Romania)	Neluț Roșu	24	EU	(Romania) Astra Giurgiu	Released	Summer	Free	Levski.bg
55	DM	(Bulgaria)	Georgi Angelov	27	EU	(Bulgaria) Beroe	Released	Summer	Free	Levski.bg
71	MF	(Bulgaria)	Vasil Panayotov	27	EU	(Bulgaria) Cherno More	End of contract	Summer	Free	topsport.bg
88	MF	(Bulgaria)	Georgi Yanev	20	EU	(Bulgaria) Strumska Slava	Released	Summer	Free	topsport.bg
	LB	(Bulgaria)	Galin Tashev	21	EU	(Bulgaria) Montana	Released	Summer	Free	
1	GK	(Slovakia)	Martin Polaček	28	EU	(Poland) Podbeskidzie	Released	Winter	Free	Levski.bg
3	CB	(Tunisia)	Aymen Belaïd	30	EU	(Saudi Arabia) Ohod	Released	Winter	Free	gong.bg
21	GK	(Bulgaria)	Bozhidar Mitrev	31	EU	(Romania) Voluntari	Released	Winter	Free	levski.bg
32	MF	(France)	Gabriel Obertan	29	EU	(Turkey) Erzurumspor	Transfer	Winter	Undisclosed	gong.bg

=== Loans out ===
No.	Pos.	Nat.	Name	Age	EU	Moving to	Type	Transfer window	Transfer fee	Source
	GK	(Bulgaria)	Aleksandar Lyubenov	23	EU	(Bulgaria) Lokomotiv Sofia	Loan	Summer	—	
6	MF	(Bulgaria)	Ivaylo Naydenov	20	EU	(Bulgaria) Arda	Loan	Winter	—	
10	FW	(Brazil)	Rivaldinho	23	EU	(Romania) Viitorul	Loan	Winter	—	
20	MF	(Portugal)	Filipe Nascimento	24	EU	(Romania) Politehnica Iași	Loan	Winter	—	levski.bg
30	FW	(Bulgaria)	Iliya Dimitrov	22	EU	(Bulgaria) Septemvri Sofia	Loan	Winter	—	
75	MF	(Bulgaria)	Aleks Borimirov	20	EU	(Bulgaria) Slavia Sofia	Loan	Winter	—	
93	MF	(Bulgaria)	Atanas Kabov	19	EU	(Bulgaria) Tsarsko Selo	Loan	Winter	—	
96	FW	(Brazil)	Luan Viana	23	Non-EU	(Bulgaria) Tsarsko Selo	Loan	Winter	—	

== Squad ==
Updated on 18 March 2019.

No.	Name	Nationality	Position(s)	Age	EU	Since	Ends	Signed from	Transfer fee	Notes
Goalkeepers
12	Petar Ivanov	Bulgaria	GK	26	EU	2018		Youth system	W/S	
13	Nikolay Mihaylov	Bulgaria	GK	38	EU	2018	2019	(Cyprus) Omonia	Free	Originally from Youth system
89	Nikolay Krastev	Bulgaria	GK	29	EU	2017		Youth system	W/S	
Defenders
2	Louis Nganioni	France	LB	31	EU	2018	2020	(France) Lyon	Free	Second nationality: DR Congo
4	Ivan Goranov	Bulgaria	LB	34	EU	2017	2021	(Bulgaria) Lokomotiv Plovdiv	Free	Originally from Youth system
5	Hólmar Örn Eyjólfsson	Iceland	CB/DM	36	EU	2017	2021	(Israel) Maccabi Haifa	500 000 €	
18	Cédric Hountondji	Benin	CB	32	EU	2019	2019	(United States) New York City	Free	Second nationality: France
19	Miloš Cvetković	Serbia	RB	36	Non-EU	2017	2019	(Serbia) Napredak Kruševac	Free	
20	Zhivko Milanov	Bulgaria	RB	42	EU	2019	2020	(Cyprus) APOEL	Free	Originally from Youth system
22	Nuno Reis	Portugal	CB/RB/DM	35	EU	2018	2021	(Portugal) Vitória Setúbal	Undisclosed	
24	Tomislav Papazov	Bulgaria	CB	24	EU	2018		Youth system	W/S	
28	David Jablonský	Czech Republic	CB/RB/LB	34	EU	2017	2019	(Russia) Tom Tomsk	Free	
39	Deyan Ivanov	Bulgaria	CB	30	EU	2014	2020	Youth system	W/S	
Midfielders
8	Davide Mariani	Switzerland	AM/CM/LW	35	EU	2018	2021	(Switzerland) Lugano	Free	Second nationality: Italy
11	Anthony Belmonte	France	DM/CM	30	EU	2017	2020	(France) Dijon	Free	
14	Bogdan Vaštšuk	Estonia	AM/CM	30	EU	2018		(Latvia) Riga	Loan	
23	Khaly Thiam	Senegal	DM	32	Non-EU	2018	2021	(Hungary) MTK Budapest	300 000 €	
70	Martin Raynov	Bulgaria	DM/CM	34	EU	2019	2020	(Bulgaria) Beroe	Undisclosed	
71	Martin Petkov	Bulgaria	AM/LW	25	EU	2018		Youth system	W/S	
77	Iliya Yurukov	Bulgaria	DM/CM	26	EU	2016		Youth system	W/S	
Forwards
7	Paulinho	Brazil	LW	33	Non-EU	2018	2021	(Ukraine) Zorya Luhansk	Free	
9	Sergiu Buș	Romania	CF	33	EU	2017	2020	(Romania) Astra Giurgiu	Free	
17	Yerkebulan Seydakhmet	Kazakhstan	RW/CF	26	Non-EU	2019	2019	(Russia) Ufa	Loan	
26	Jerson Cabral	Cape Verde	RW/LW	35	EU	2017	2019	(France) Bastia	Free	Second nationality: Netherlands
29	Stanislav Kostov	Bulgaria	CF	34	EU	2018	2020	(Bulgaria) Pirin Blagoevgrad	Free	
86	Valeri Bojinov	Bulgaria	CF	40	EU	2019	2020	(Bulgaria) Botev Vratsa	Free	
99	Stanislav Ivanov	Bulgaria	CF/AM/RW	27	EU	2016		Youth system	W/S	

== Performance overview ==
Competition	First match	Last match	Starting round	Final position	Record							
Competition	First match	Last match	Starting round	Final position	Pld	W	D	L	GF	GA	GD	Win %
First League	21 July 2018	28 May 2019	Matchday 1	3rd	37	21	6	10	65	37	+28	56.76
Bulgarian Cup	25 September 2018	31 October 2018	Round of 32	Round of 16	2	1	1	0	8	2	+6	50.00
UEFA Europa League	11 July 2018	17 July 2018	First qualifying round	First qualifying round	2	1	0	1	3	3	+0	50.00
Total					41	23	7	11	76	42	+34	56.10

Source: Fixtures

== Fixtures ==
Win Draw Loss Upcoming fixture

=== Friendlies ===
==== Summer ====
20 June 2018	Hebar	0–4	Levski Sofia	Pazardzhik
17:30 EET		Report	Gómez 18', 74'; Buș 21'; Jablonský 66'	Stadium: Georgi Benkovski

27 June 2018	Levski Sofia	1–2	Septemvri Sofia	Pravets
17:30 EET	Thiam 56'	Report	Galchev 44'; Budinov 84'	Stadium: Pravets Sports Complex

5 July 2018	Levski Sofia (Bulgaria)	1–0	(Ukraine) Oleksandriya	Sofia
18:30 EET	Obertan 21'	Report		Stadium: Vivacom Arena - Georgi Asparuhov

==== Mid-season ====
8 September 2018	Levski Sofia (Bulgaria)	1–0	(Serbia) Radnik Surdulica	Sofia
18:00 EET	Paulinho 6' (pen.)	Report		Stadium: Vivacom Arena - Georgi Asparuhov

13 October 2018	Levski Sofia	2–0	Lokomotiv Sofia	Sofia
17:00 EET	Mariani 18'; M. P. Petkov 89'	Report		Stadium: Vivacom Arena - Georgi Asparuhov

17 November 2018	Levski Sofia	2–3	Montana	Sofia
11:30 EET	Kabov 26'; Paulinho 41'	Report	Georgiev 6'; Iliev 52'; Damyanov 76'	Stadium: Vivacom Arena - Georgi Asparuhov

==== Winter ====
19 January 2019	Levski Sofia (Bulgaria)	1–1	(Russia) Ufa	Larnaca, Cyprus
15:00 EET	Nkololo 21'	Report	Bizjak 56' (pen.)	Stadium: GSZ

25 January 2019	Levski Sofia (Bulgaria)	0–1	(China) Henan Jianye	Larnaca, Cyprus
15:00 EET		Report	Bassogog 25'	Stadium: GSZ

30 January 2019	Levski Sofia (Bulgaria)	1–2	(Poland) Wisła Płock	Larnaca, Cyprus
12:30 EET	Mariani 66' (pen.)	Report	García 33'; Varela 72'	Stadium: GSZ

2 February 2019	Levski Sofia (Bulgaria)	1–2	(Russia) Ural	Larnaca, Cyprus
14:00 EET	Kostov 52'	Report	Panyukov 3', 10'	Stadium: GSZ

5 February 2019	Levski Sofia (Bulgaria)	1–1	(Lithuania) Sūduva	Larnaca, Cyprus
16:00 EET	Mariani 79'	Report	Barauskas 76'	Stadium: GSZ

8 February 2019	Levski Sofia (Bulgaria)	1–1	(Serbia) Čukarički	Pyrgos, Cyprus
17:00 EET	Mariani 7'	Report	Đorđević 33'	Stadium: Pyrgos Arena

=== Parva Liga ===
==== Preliminary stage ====
===== League table =====
Pos	Team	Pld	W	D	L	GF	GA	GD	Pts	Qualification
1	Ludogorets Razgrad	26	19	5	2	53	14	+39	62	Qualification for the Championship round
2	CSKA Sofia	26	18	3	5	47	14	+33	57	Qualification for the Championship round
3	Levski Sofia	26	17	3	6	51	24	+27	54	Qualification for the Championship round
4	Botev Plovdiv	26	13	6	7	39	21	+18	45	Qualification for the Championship round
5	Cherno More	26	12	6	8	36	34	+2	42	Qualification for the Championship round

Source: Soccerway
Rules for classification: 1) Points; 2) Head-to-head points; 3) Head-to-head goal difference; 4) Head-to-head goals scored; 5) Head-to-head away goals scored (only if two teams); 6) Goal difference; 7) Goals scored; 8) Fairplay ranking; 9) Draw.

===== Results summary =====
Overall								Home						Away					
Pld	W	D	L	GF	GA	GD	Pts	W	D	L	GF	GA	GD	W	D	L	GF	GA	GD
26	17	3	6	51	24	+27	54	9	2	2	30	11	+19	8	1	4	21	13	+8

Last updated: 16 March 2019.
Source: bulgarian-football.com

===== Results by round =====
Round	1	2	3	4	5	6	7	8	9	10	11	12	13	14	15	16	17	18	19	20	21	22	23	24	25	26
Ground	A	H	A	A	H	A	H	A	H	A	H	A	H	H	A	H	H	A	H	A	H	A	H	A	H	A
Result	W	D	W	W	W	W	W	L	W	W	W	L	W	W	L	L	W	D	W	L	D	W	W	W	L	W
Position	5	3	2	2	1	1	1	2	2	1	1	2	2	2	3	3	3	3	3	3	3	3	2	2	3	3

Source: See Results
A = Away; H = Home; W = Win; D = Draw; L = Loss

===== Matches =====
21 July 2018 1	Botev Plovdiv	0–1	Levski Sofia	Plovdiv
20:45 EET	N'Dongala (yellow card) 31'; K. Dimitrov (yellow card) 52'	Report	Mariani (yellow card) 7'; Belmonte (yellow card) 12'; Goranov (yellow card) 47'; I. Dimitrov 90+3'	Stadium: Botev 1912 Football Complex; Attendance: 3,100; Referee: Stanislav Todorov; Man of the Match: Gabriel Obertan

30 July 2018 2	Levski Sofia	2–2	Cherno More	Sofia
20:30 EET	Belaïd (yellow card) 8'; Kostov 60'; Mariani 89'	Report	Iliev 22'; N'Dongala (yellow card) 43'; Fennouche (yellow card) 53'; Ognyanov (yellow card) 68'; Bozhilov 88'	Stadium: Vivacom Arena - Georgi Asparuhov; Attendance: 2,900; Referee: Georgi Kabakov; Man of the Match: Georgi Iliev

5 August 2018 3	Botev Vratsa	0–2	Levski Sofia	Montana
18:30 EET	Fidanin (yellow card) 34'; Ivanov (yellow card) 36'; Gadzhev (yellow card) 49'; Mihaylov (yellow card) 61'	Report	Kostov 8'; Gómez (yellow card) 25'; Jablonský (yellow card) 31'; Thiam (yellow card) 56'; Cabral 85'	Stadium: Ogosta; Attendance: 3,490; Referee: Stefan Apostolov; Man of the Match: Stanislav Kostov

11 August 2018 4	Dunav Ruse	1–2	Levski Sofia	Ruse
21:00 EET	Vasev 53' (pen.); Patev (yellow card) 62'	Report	Naydenov (yellow card) 33'; Cabral 59', (yellow card) 62'; Gómez (yellow card) 71'; Belaïd (yellow card) 73'; Eyjólfsson 78'; Thiam (yellow card) 90+1'	Stadium: Gradski; Attendance: 4,000; Referee: Stanislav Stavrov; Man of the Match: Jerson Cabral

19 August 2018 5	Levski Sofia	2–0	Septemvri Sofia	Sofia
18:15 EET	Mariani 23'; Kostov 29'	Report	Fabiano (yellow card) 48'; Diaby (yellow card) 60'; Dimitrov (yellow card) 71'	Stadium: Vivacom Arena - Georgi Asparuhov; Attendance: 2,650; Referee: Petar Kostadinov; Man of the Match: Miloš Cvetković

25 August 2018 6	Etar	1–2	Levski Sofia	Veliko Tarnovo
18:45 EET	I. Stoyanov (yellow card) 10'; Bojaj 63'; K. Stoyanov (yellow card) 70'; Sarmov (yellow card) 71'	Report	Cabral 26'; Kostov 44', (yellow card) 45'; Thiam (yellow card) 68'; Polaček (yellow card) 90'; Buș (yellow card) 90+10'	Stadium: Ivaylo; Attendance: 6,680; Referee: Stefan Apostolov; Man of the Match: Gabriel Obertan

1 September 2018 7	Levski Sofia	1–0	Beroe	Sofia
21:00 EET	Belaïd (yellow card) 28'; Thiam (yellow card) 34'; Belmonte 50'	Report	Hadzhiev (yellow card) 11'; Bandalovski (yellow card) 23'; Alkan (yellow card) 70'; Alfredo (yellow card) 71'	Stadium: Vivacom Arena - Georgi Asparuhov; Attendance: 6,300; Referee: Nikolay Yordanov; Man of the Match: Anthony Belmonte

16 September 2018 8	Lokomotiv Plovdiv	1–0	Levski Sofia	Plovdiv
20:00 EET	Bouhna (yellow card) 5'; Aralica 14', (yellow card) 29'; Tomašević (yellow card) 51'; Petrović (yellow card) 90+1'	Report	Belmonte (yellow card) 4'; Mariani (yellow card) 31'; Thiam (yellow card) 34'; Mitrev (yellow card) 35'; Cabral (yellow card) 45+1'; Belaïd (yellow card) 75'; Cvetković (yellow card) 77'	Stadium: Lokomotiv; Attendance: 3,900; Referee: Stanislav Todorov; Man of the Match: Ante Aralica

21 September 2018 9	Levski Sofia	4–1	Vitosha Bistritsa	Sofia
20:00 EET	Jablonský 3'; Cabral 52'; Paulinho (penalty missed) 63'; Kostov 65', 74'	Report	Mutafchiyski (yellow card) 62'; Dolapchiev 83'	Stadium: Vivacom Arena - Georgi Asparuhov; Attendance: 2,600; Referee: Nedelcho Gadzhalov; Man of the Match: Stanislav Kostov

29 September 2018 10	CSKA Sofia	0–1	Levski Sofia	Sofia
17:00 EET	Chorbadzhiyski (yellow card) 16'; Pinto (yellow card) 42'; Tiago (yellow card) 45'; Despodov (yellow card) 86'	Report	Černiauskas 31' (o.g.); Thiam (yellow card) 85'; Goranov (yellow card) 86'; Cvetković (yellow card) 90+2'	Stadium: Vasil Levski National Stadium; Attendance: 23,000; Referee: Ivaylo Stoyanov; Man of the Match: Gabriel Obertan

7 October 2018 11	Levski Sofia	2–0	Slavia Sofia	Sofia
19:15 EET	Kostov 27', 50'; Eyjólfsson (yellow card) 52'; Belmonte (yellow card) 61'	Report	Ivanov (yellow card) 18'; Marem (yellow card) 70'; Uzunov (yellow card) 72'	Stadium: Vivacom Arena - Georgi Asparuhov; Attendance: 8,300; Referee: Dragomir Draganov; Man of the Match: Stanislav Kostov

20 October 2018 12	Ludogorets Razgrad	2–1	Levski Sofia	Razgrad
19:00 EET	Dyakov (yellow card) 18'; Nedyalkov (yellow card) 19'; Lukoki 35'; Wanderson 45+1'; Cicinho (yellow card) 78'; Renan (yellow card) 90'; Bakalov (yellow card) 90+2'; Moți (yellow card) 90+4'	Report	Cvetković (yellow card) 11'; Belmonte (yellow card) 51'; Kostov 54'; Nascimento (yellow card) 87'; Thiam (yellow card) 90+4'	Stadium: Ludogorets Arena; Attendance: 6,400; Referee: Georgi Kabakov; Man of the Match: Wanderson

26 October 2018 13	Levski Sofia	7–0	Vereya	Sofia
19:45 EET	Reis 10'; Kostov 20', 49'; Mariani 45' (pen.), 57'; Thiam 74'; Eyjólfsson 90'	Report	Kouroupis (yellow card) 24'; Machaidze (red card) 44'	Stadium: Vivacom Arena - Georgi Asparuhov; Attendance: 8,000; Referee: Radoslav Gidzhenov; Man of the Match: Stanislav Kostov

4 November 2018 14	Levski Sofia	4–1	Botev Plovdiv	Sofia
15:00 EET	Kostov 29', 55'; Thiam 51'; Obertan (yellow card) 62'; Mariani 74'	Report	Pirgov (yellow card) 36'; Vutov 45+1'	Stadium: Vivacom Arena - Georgi Asparuhov; Attendance: 6,900; Referee: Nikola Popov; Man of the Match: Stanislav Kostov

10 November 2018 15	Cherno More	1–0	Levski Sofia	Varna
15:00 EET	Jorginho 22'; Vitanov (yellow card) 41'; Fennouche (yellow card) 49'; Kostadinov (yellow card) 66'; Andrade (yellow card) 80'	Report	Paulinho (yellow card) 33'; Reis (yellow card) 47'; Cabral (yellow card) 68' (yellow-red card) 69'	Stadium: Ticha; Attendance: 4,800; Referee: Nikolay Yordanov; Man of the Match: Jorginho

25 November 2018 16	Levski Sofia	1–3	Botev Vratsa	Sofia
17:30 EET	Mariani 20' (pen.); Cvetković (yellow card) 33'; Goranov (yellow card) 73'; Thiam (yellow card) 82' (yellow-red card) 90+2'	Report	Kerchev (yellow card) 19'; Bojinov 34' (pen.), 76'; Gadzhev (yellow card) 41'; Milanov (yellow card) 51'; Mihaylov (yellow card) 66'; Domovchiyski 87'; Kostov (yellow card) 90+1'	Stadium: Vivacom Arena - Georgi Asparuhov; Attendance: 3,100; Referee: Georgi Kabakov; Man of the Match: Valeri Bojinov

1 December 2018 17	Levski Sofia	3–0	Dunav Ruse	Sofia
17:30 EET	Cabral 21', 28' (pen.); Kostov 38'; Jablonský (yellow card) 68'	Report	Kovachev (yellow card) 27'	Stadium: Vivacom Arena - Georgi Asparuhov; Attendance: 840; Referee: Dragomir Draganov; Man of the Match: Jerson Cabral

5 December 2018 18	Septemvri Sofia	2–2	Levski Sofia	Sofia
17:30 EET	Fabiano (yellow card) 17' (yellow-red card) 82'; Stoyanov (yellow card) 55', (goal) 66'; Budinov 90+4'	Report	Jablonský (yellow card) 53'; Kostov 60'; Cabral 80' (pen.)	Stadium: Vasil Levski National Stadium; Attendance: 570; Referee: Petar Kostadinov; Man of the Match: Miroslav Budinov

8 December 2018 19	Levski Sofia	2–1	Etar	Sofia
17:30 EET	Kostov 20'; Buș 54'	Report	Batrović 8'	Stadium: Vivacom Arena - Georgi Asparuhov; Attendance: 850; Referee: Nikola Popov; Man of the Match: Stanislav Kostov

15 December 2018 20	Beroe	2–1	Levski Sofia	Stara Zagora
17:30 EET	Kamburov 39'; Vasilev 79', (yellow card) 85'	Report	Jablonský (yellow card) 38'; Reis (yellow card) 65'; Obertan 77'	Stadium: Beroe; Attendance: 2,300; Referee: Vladimir Valkov; Man of the Match: Martin Kamburov

17 February 2019 21	Levski Sofia	1–1	Lokomotiv Plovdiv	Sofia
17:30 EET	Jablonský (yellow card) 8'; Mariani 71'	Report	Aralica 45'; Petrović (yellow card) 62'; Tsvetanov (yellow card) 83'	Stadium: Vivacom Arena - Georgi Asparuhov; Attendance: 7,100; Referee: Dragomir Draganov; Man of the Match: Davide Mariani

20 February 2019 22	Vitosha Bistritsa	0–2	Levski Sofia	Sofia
17:30 EET	Milchev (yellow card) 66'	Report	Paulinho 22'; Kostov 42'; Cvetković (yellow card) 81'	Stadium: Vasil Levski National Stadium; Attendance: 940; Referee: Petar Kostadinov; Man of the Match: Stanislav Kostov

24 February 2019 23	Levski Sofia	1–0	CSKA Sofia	Sofia
13:00 EET	Paulinho (yellow card) 31'; Goranov (yellow card) 43'; Pereira 45+2' (o.g.); Thiam (yellow card) 56'; Cvetković (yellow card) 69'	Report	Gyasi (red card) 43'; Chorbadzhiyski (yellow card) 63'; Turitsov (yellow card) 66'; Pereira (yellow card) 90+4'	Stadium: Vasil Levski National Stadium; Attendance: 11,000; Referee: Vladimir Valkov; Man of the Match: Nikolay Mihaylov

3 March 2019 24	Slavia Sofia	0–3	Levski Sofia	Sofia
17:30 EET	Stanisavljević (yellow card) 67' (yellow-red card) 90+4'; Marem (yellow card) 90+3'	Report	Kostov 4'; Cabral 40'; Paulinho (yellow card) 50', (penalty missed) 60'; Mariani 55'	Stadium: Vasil Levski National Stadium; Attendance: 4,300; Referee: Stanislav Todorov; Man of the Match: Davide Mariani

10 March 2019 25	Levski Sofia	0–2	Ludogorets Razgrad	Sofia
17:30 EET	Paulinho (yellow card) 48'; Jablonský (yellow card) 79'; Thiam (yellow card) 90'	Report	Marcelinho 21', (yellow card) 39'; Wanderson (yellow card) 38'; Moți (yellow card) 45'; Grigore (yellow card) 69'; Dyakov (yellow card) 77'; Lukoki 90+2'	Stadium: Vivacom Arena - Georgi Asparuhov; Attendance: 14,700; Referee: Dragomir Draganov; Man of the Match: Marcelinho

16 March 2019 26	Vereya	3–4	Levski Sofia	Stara Zagora
12:30 EET	Reis 30' (o.g.); Gvazava (yellow card) 42' (yellow-red card) 69'; Ngeyitala 56'; Dobrovolskyi (yellow card) 59'; Ntoya (yellow card) 76'; Stanchev 90+3'	Report	Mariani 28' (pen.); Buș 33'; Kostov 38'; Bojinov 70' (pen.), (yellow card) 76'	Stadium: Trace Arena; Attendance: 1,150; Referee: Georgi Ivanov; Man of the Match: Stanislav Kostov

==== Championship stage ====
===== League table =====
Pos	Team	Pld	W	D	L	GF	GA	GD	Pts	Qualification
1	Ludogorets Razgrad (C)	36	23	10	3	67	19	+48	79	Qualification for the Champions League first qualifying round
2	CSKA Sofia	36	24	6	6	57	17	+40	78	Qualification for the Europa League first qualifying round
3	Levski Sofia (O)	36	20	6	10	64	37	+27	66	Qualification for the European play-off final
4	Beroe	36	16	10	10	42	30	+12	58	
5	Cherno More	36	15	7	14	44	51	−7	52	
6	Botev Plovdiv	36	14	8	14	44	36	+8	50	

Source: Soccerway
Rules for classification: 1) Points; 2) Head-to-head points; 3) Head-to-head goal difference; 4) Head-to-head goals scored; 5) Head-to-head away goals scored (only if two teams); 6) Goal difference; 7) Goals scored; 8) Fairplay ranking; 9) Draw.
(C) Champions; (O) Play-off winners

===== Results summary =====
Overall								Home						Away					
Pld	W	D	L	GF	GA	GD	Pts	W	D	L	GF	GA	GD	W	D	L	GF	GA	GD
10	3	3	4	13	13	0	12	1	1	3	7	8	−1	2	2	1	6	5	+1

Last updated: 24 May 2019.
Source: See Results

===== Results by round =====
Round	1	2	3	4	5	6	7	8	9	10
Ground	H	A	H	A	H	A	H	A	H	A
Result	D	W	L	D	L	W	W	D	L	L
Position	3	3	3	3	3	3	3	3	3	3

Source: See results
A = Away; H = Home; W = Win; D = Draw; L = Loss

==== Matches ====
31 March 2019 27	Levski Sofia	1–1	Botev Plovdiv	Sofia
20:30 EET	Jablonský (yellow card) 13'; Mariani 37' (pen.); Reis (yellow card) 39'; Paulinho (yellow card) 70'; Goranov (yellow card) 86'; Buș (yellow card) 90+3'	Report	Terziev (yellow card) 28'; Baltanov (yellow card) 34' (yellow-red card) 51'; Vutov (yellow card) 38'; Dimitrov 47'	Stadium: Vivacom Arena - Georgi Asparuhov; Attendance: 5,600; Referee: Nikola Popov; Man of the Match: Kristian Dimitrov

7 April 2019 28	Cherno More	0–1	Levski Sofia	Varna
17:30 EET	Andrade (yellow card) 60'; Vasilev (yellow card) 87'	Report	Kostov 16'; Reis (yellow card) 18'; Thiam (yellow card) 41'; Nganioni (yellow card) 70' (yellow-red card) 83'; Milanov (yellow card) 90+3'	Stadium: Ticha; Attendance: 4,200; Referee: Vladimir Valkov; Man of the Match: Stanislav Kostov

14 April 2019 29	Levski Sofia	0–2	Ludogorets Razgrad	Sofia
19:00 EET	Raynov (yellow card) 35'; Cvetković (yellow card) 71'; Paulinho (yellow card) 76'; Goranov (red card) 79'	Report	Moți (yellow card) 33' (yellow-red card) 82', (goal) 80' (pen.); Keșerü 37'; Góralski (yellow card) 42'; Cicinho (yellow card) 59'	Stadium: Vasil Levski National Stadium; Attendance: 7,700; Referee: Ivaylo Stoyanov; Man of the Match: Claudiu Keșerü

20 April 2019 30	CSKA Sofia	0–0	Levski Sofia	Sofia
17:15 EET	Malinov (yellow card) 62'; Antov (yellow card) 67'; Bodurov (yellow card) 86'	Report	Milanov (yellow card) 13'; Reis (yellow card) 57'; Raynov (yellow card) 79'; Vaštšuk (yellow card) 89'; M. D. Petkov (yellow card) 90+2'	Stadium: Vasil Levski National Stadium; Attendance: 15,900; Referee: Stanislav Todorov; Man of the Match: Nikolay Mihaylov

27 April 2019 31	Levski Sofia	1–2	Beroe	Sofia
20:30 EET	Kostov 49'; Milanov (yellow card) 71'; Yurukov (yellow card) 73'; Reis (yellow card) 88'	Report	Minchev (yellow card) 36'; Ohene 54', (yellow card) 87'; Bandalovski (yellow card) 60'; Baranov (yellow card) 64'; Eugénio 77'	Stadium: Vivacom Arena - Georgi Asparuhov; Attendance: 3,200; Referee: Stefan Apostolov; Man of the Match: Pedro Eugénio

4 May 2019 32	Botev Plovdiv	1–3	Levski Sofia	Plovdiv
20:00 EET	Nedelev 68'; Pirgov (yellow card) 80'	Report	Kostov 22' (pen.); Thiam (yellow card) 40'; Mariani (yellow card) 77'; S. Ivanov 87'; Bojinov 90'	Stadium: Botev 1912 Football Complex; Attendance: 3,100; Referee: Georgi Kabakov; Man of the Match: Stanislav Ivanov

12 May 2019 33	Levski Sofia	5–1	Cherno More	Sofia
19:00 EET	Kostov 16', 46'; Paulinho 19'; Mariani 31'; S. Ivanov 83'	Report	Dimov (yellow card) 44'; Vitanov (yellow card) 64'; Kiki 86'; Stanchev (yellow card) 88'	Stadium: Vivacom Arena - Georgi Asparuhov; Attendance: 1,700; Referee: Ivaylo Stoyanov; Man of the Match: Stanislav Kostov

18 May 2019 34	Ludogorets Razgrad	1–1	Levski Sofia	Razgrad
18:00 EET	Grigore (yellow card) 12' (yellow-red card) 70'; Anicet (yellow card) 35' (yellow-red card) 85'; Moți 51' (pen.); Popa (yellow card) 57'	Report	Raynov (yellow card) 14'; Bojinov (yellow card) 22'; D. Ivanov (yellow card) 46' (red card) 47'; Milanov 72'; Nganioni (yellow card) 89'	Stadium: Ludogorets Arena; Attendance: 4,000; Referee: Nikolay Yordanov; Man of the Match: Zhivko Milanov

21 May 2019 35	Levski Sofia	0–2	CSKA Sofia	Sofia
18:00 EET	Milanov (yellow card) 66'; Reis (yellow card) 78' (yellow-red card) 84'; M. D. Petkov (yellow card) 90+2'	Report	Malinov (yellow card) 56'; Tiago 70'; Evandro 86'; Chorbadzhiyski (yellow card) 87'	Stadium: Vasil Levski National Stadium; Attendance: 11,200; Referee: Dragomir Draganov; Man of the Match: Tiago Rodrigues

24 May 2019 36	Beroe	3–1	Levski Sofia	Stara Zagora
17:15 EET	Brígido 28'; Kamburov 50', 89'; Bandalovski (yellow card) 54'	Report	Bojinov 70' (pen.); Mariani (yellow card) 73'; I. Ivanov (yellow card) 83'	Stadium: Beroe; Attendance: 1,900; Referee: Ivaylo Stoyanov; Man of the Match: Martin Kamburov

==== European play-off final ====
28 May 2019	Levski Sofia	1–0	Etar	Sofia
20:00 EET	Yurukov (yellow card) 48'; Bojinov 72'; Thiam (yellow card) 75'	Report	Sarmov (yellow card) 75'; Galabov (yellow card) 86'; Iliev (yellow card) 90+1'	Stadium: Vivacom Arena - Georgi Asparuhov; Attendance: 7,300; Referee: Volen Chinkov; Man of the Match: Valeri Bojinov

=== Bulgarian Cup ===
25 September 2018 First round	Atletik Kuklen	0–6	Levski Sofia	Plovdiv
16:00 EET	Romanov (yellow card) 16'; Nerdzhib (yellow card) 52'	Report	Kabov 40'; Buș 44'; S. Ivanov 72', 75'; Gyuzlev 74' (o.g.); Nascimento 85'	Stadium: Lokomotiv; Attendance: 1,430; Referee: Stefan Pavlov

31 October 2018 Second round	Cherno More	2–2 (a.e.t.) (5–4 p)	Levski Sofia	Varna
16:00 EET	Zehirov 12', (yellow card) 37'; Iliev (yellow card) 31'; Vasilev (yellow card) 73'; Enchev (yellow card) 83'; Bozhilov 90+1'; Minchev (yellow card) 92'; Hassani (red card) FT	Report	Cabral 10'; Reis (yellow card) 19'; Cvetković (yellow card) 35'; Jablonský (yellow card) 57'; Thiam 78'; Obertan (yellow card) 84'; Naydenov (yellow card) 107'; Rivaldinho (red card) FT	Stadium: Ticha; Attendance: 3,900; Referee: Ivaylo Stoyanov
	Penalties
	Iliev (penalty scored); Bozhilov (penalty missed); Panayotov (penalty scored); Vasilev (penalty scored); Andrade (penalty scored); Dimov (penalty scored)		(penalty scored) Cabral; (penalty scored) Jablonský; (penalty scored) Cvetković; (penalty scored) Thiam; (penalty missed) Nascimento; (penalty missed) Reis

=== UEFA Europa League ===
==== First qualifying round ====
11 July 2018 1st leg	Vaduz (Liechtenstein)	1–0	(Bulgaria) Levski Sofia	Vaduz, Liechtenstein
17:45 CEST	Coulibaly 14' von Niederhäusern (yellow card) 41'; Göppel (yellow card) 76'	Report	Belmonte (yellow card) 16'; Belaïd (yellow card) 22'; Jablonský (yellow card) 47'; Goranov (yellow card) 89'	Stadium: Rheinpark Stadion; Attendance: 1,243; Referee: Fran Jović (Croatia)

17 July 2018 2nd leg	Levski Sofia (Bulgaria)	3–2 (3–3 (a) agg.)	(Liechtenstein) Vaduz	Sofia, Bulgaria
18:45 EEST	Buș 35', (penalty missed) 76'; Cabral (yellow card) 52', (goal) 85'; Belaïd 53'; Gómez (yellow card) 63'; Goranov (yellow card) 90+1'; Kostov (red card) 90+4'	Report	Coulibaly 25' von Niederhäusern (yellow card) 41'; Lüchinger (yellow card) 52'; Tadić 55', (yellow card) 75'	Stadium: Vivacom Arena - Georgi Asparuhov; Attendance: 6,100; Referee: Rob Harvey (Ireland)

== Squad statistics ==
As of match played 28 May 2019

No.	Pos	Nat	Player	Total		Parva Liga		Bulgarian Cup		UEFA Europa League	
No.	Pos	Nat	Player	Apps	Goals	Apps	Goals	Apps	Goals	Apps	Goals
2	DF	(France) FRA	Louis Nganioni	7	0	7	0	0	0	0	0
4	DF	(Bulgaria) BUL	Ivan Goranov	33	0	28+1	0	2	0	2	0
5	DF	(Iceland) ISL	Hólmar Örn Eyjólfsson	12	2	11+1	2	0	0	0	0
7	MF	(Brazil) BRA	Paulinho	27	2	22+4	2	1	0	0	0
8	MF	(Switzerland) SUI	Davide Mariani	39	11	33+3	11	1	0	2	0
9	FW	(Romania) ROU	Sergiu Buș	21	4	4+14	2	1	1	2	1
11	MF	(France) FRA	Anthony Belmonte	18	1	11+5	1	0	0	2	0
12	GK	(Bulgaria) BUL	Petar Ivanov	0	0	0	0	0	0	0	0
13	GK	(Bulgaria) BUL	Nikolay Mihaylov	16	0	16	0	0	0	0	0
14	MF	(Estonia) EST	Bogdan Vaštšuk	10	1	1+9	1	0	0	0	0
17	FW	(Kazakhstan) KAZ	Yerkebulan Seydakhmet	3	0	2+1	0	0	0	0	0
18	DF	(Benin) BEN	Cédric Hountondji	6	0	3+3	0	0	0	0	0
19	DF	(Serbia) SRB	Miloš Cvetković	32	0	27+1	0	2	0	2	0
20	DF	(Bulgaria) BUL	Zhivko Milanov	11	1	10+1	1	0	0	0	0
22	DF	(Portugal) POR	Nuno Reis	27	1	23+2	1	2	0	0	0
23	MF	(Senegal) SEN	Khaly Thiam	32	3	30	2	2	1	0	0
24	DF	(Bulgaria) BUL	Tomislav Papazov	1	0	0+1	0	0	0	0	0
26	MF	(Cape Verde) CPV	Jerson Cabral	29	10	25+1	8	1	1	2	1
28	DF	(Czech Republic) CZE	David Jablonský	24	1	20+1	1	1	0	2	0
29	FW	(Bulgaria) BUL	Stanislav Kostov	39	24	32+4	24	1	0	0+2	0
33	DF	(Bulgaria) BUL	Ivaylo Ivanov	1	0	0+1	0	0	0	0	0
39	DF	(Bulgaria) BUL	Deyan Ivanov	6	0	6	0	0	0	0	0
70	MF	(Bulgaria) BUL	Martin Raynov	16	0	14+2	0	0	0	0	0
71	MF	(Bulgaria) BUL	Martin P. Petkov	1	0	0+1	0	0	0	0	0
77	FW	(Bulgaria) BUL	Iliya Yurukov	15	0	9+6	0	0	0	0	0
79	MF	(Bulgaria) BUL	Martin D. Petkov	8	0	1+7	0	0	0	0	0
86	FW	(Bulgaria) BUL	Valeri Bojinov	11	4	4+7	4	0	0	0	0
89	GK	(Bulgaria) BUL	Nikolay Krastev	2	0	1	0	1	0	0	0
99	FW	(Bulgaria) BUL	Stanislav Ivanov	20	4	11+6	2	0+2	2	0+1	0
Players away from the club on loan:
6	MF	(Bulgaria) BUL	Ivaylo Naydenov	9	0	2+5	0	0+2	0	0	0
10	FW	(Brazil) BRA	Rivaldinho	5	0	0+4	0	0+1	0	0	0
20	MF	(Portugal) POR	Filipe Nascimento	10	1	0+8	0	1+1	1	0	0
30	FW	(Bulgaria) BUL	Iliya Dimitrov	5	1	0+3	1	0	0	0+2	0
75	MF	(Bulgaria) BUL	Aleks Borimirov	0	0	0	0	0	0	0	0
93	MF	(Bulgaria) BUL	Atanas Kabov	2	1	0+1	1	1	0	0	0
96	FW	(Brazil) BRA	Luan Viana	1	0	0+1	0	0	0	0	0
	GK	(Bulgaria) BUL	Aleksandar Lyubenov	0	0	0	0	0	0	0	0
Players who left Levski Sofia during the season:
1	GK	(Slovakia) SVK	Martin Polaček	16	0	15	0	0	0	0+1	0
3	DF	(Tunisia) TUN	Aymen Belaïd	13	1	9+1	0	0+1	0	2	1
8	AM	(Bulgaria) BUL	Antonio Vutov	0	0	0	0	0	0	0	0
13	MF	(Spain) ESP	Jordi Gómez	6	0	3+1	0	0	0	2	0
15	MF	(Slovakia) SVK	Roman Procházka	0	0	0	0	0	0	0	0
21	GK	(Bulgaria) BUL	Bozhidar Mitrev	8	0	5	0	1	0	2	0
25	DF	(Portugal) POR	Afonso Figueiredo	0	0	0	0	0	0	0	0
30	MF	(Romania) ROU	Neluț Roșu	0	0	0	0	0	0	0	0
32	MF	(France) FRA	Gabriel Obertan	23	1	20	1	1	0	2	0
55	DF	(Bulgaria) BUL	Georgi Angelov	0	0	0	0	0	0	0	0
71	MF	(Bulgaria) BUL	Vasil Panayotov	0	0	0	0	0	0	0	0
88	MF	(Bulgaria) BUL	Georgi Yanev	0	0	0	0	0	0	0	0
91	GK	(Bulgaria) BUL	Dimitar Sheytanov	0	0	0	0	0	0	0	0
	DF	(Bulgaria) BUL	Galin Tashev	0	0	0	0	0	0	0	0
