= 2018–19 PFC CSKA Sofia season =

CSKA Sofia
2018–19 season
- Controlling owner: (Bulgaria) Grisha Ganchev
- Manager: (United Kingdom) (Serbia) Nestor El Maestro (until 7 February 2019) (Bulgaria) Lyuboslav Penev (until 3 May 2019) (Bulgaria) Dobromir Mitov (interim) (since 3 May 2019)
- Parva Liga: Second place
- Bulgarian Cup: Semi-final
- Europa League: Third qualifying round
Home colours	Away colours	Third colours

The 2018–19 season is CSKA Sofia's 70th season in the First League and their third consecutive participation after their administrative relegation in the third division due to mounting financial troubles. This article shows player statistics and all matches (official and friendly) that the club will play during the 2018–19 season.

== Players ==
=== Current squad ===
As of 8 February 2019 Note: Flags indicate national team as defined under FIFA eligibility rules; some limited exceptions apply. Players may hold more than one non-FIFA nationality.

No.	Pos.	Nation	Player
1	GK	CRO	Dante Stipica
2	DF	BUL	Stoycho Atanasov
3	DF	BRA	Geferson
4	DF	BUL	Bozhidar Chorbadzhiyski
5	DF	BUL	Nikolay Bodurov (captain)
6	MF	POR	Rúben Pinto (vice-captain)
7	MF	GBS	Jorginho
8	MF	GHA	Edwin Gyasi
10	FW	BRA	Evandro
12	GK	BUL	Slavi Petrov
14	DF	BUL	Angel Lyaskov

No.	Pos.	Nation	Player
15	MF	BUL	Kristiyan Malinov
16	MF	POR	Janio Bikel
17	MF	BRA	Henrique
19	DF	BUL	Ivan Turitsov
20	MF	POR	Tiago Rodrigues
22	FW	GAM	Ali Sowe
24	DF	POR	Nuno Tomás
25	DF	CPV	Steven Pereira
26	DF	BUL	Valentin Antov
30	GK	LTU	Vytautas Černiauskas

== Transfers ==
=== Summer transfers ===
In:

No.	Pos.	Nation	Player
1	GK	CRO	Dante Stipica (from (Croatia) Hajduk Split)
7	MF	GBS	Jorginho (on loan from (France) Saint-Étienne)
9	FW	BRA	Maurides (from (Portugal) Belenenses)
10	FW	BRA	Evandro (from (Brazil) Coritiba)
14	DF	BUL	Angel Lyaskov (loan return from Litex Lovech)
16	MF	POR	Janio Bikel (from (Netherlands) NEC Nijmegen)
16	DF	BUL	Ivan Turitsov (loan return from Litex Lovech)
17	MF	BRA	Henrique (from (Brazil) Atlético Mineiro, previously on loan)
21	FW	BUL	Tonislav Yordanov (loan return from Litex Lovech)
22	FW	GAM	Ali Sowe (on loan from (Italy) Chievo)
22	MF	BUL	Nikola Kolev (loan return from Etar Veliko Tarnovo)
25	DF	CPV	Steven Pereira (from (Netherlands) MVV Maastricht)
27	FW	BUL	Georgi Minchev (loan return from Tsarsko Selo)
27	DF	SVK	Boris Sekulić (from (Slovakia) Slovan Bratislava)
28	DF	BUL	Plamen Galabov (loan return from Etar Veliko Tarnovo)
—	DF	BUL	Galin Minkov (loan return from Tsarsko Selo)
—	MF	BUL	Reyan Daskalov (loan return from Tsarsko Selo)

Out:

No.	Pos.	Nation	Player
7	FW	COL	Jean Carlos Blanco (to (Colombia) Independiente Medellín)
9	FW	BRA	Fernando Karanga (to (China) Henan Jianye)
10	MF	NED	Roland Alberg (to (Greece) Panionios)
12	GK	BUL	Slavi Petrov (on loan at Litex Lovech)
14	MF	POR	Ukra (to (Portugal) Santa Clara)
16	MF	CMR	Raoul Loé (to (Cyprus) Omonia)
16	DF	BUL	Ivan Turitsov (on loan to Litex Lovech)
18	MF	BUL	Aleksandar Georgiev (on loan at Septemvri Sofia)
21	FW	BUL	Tonislav Yordanov (on loan at Litex Lovech)
22	MF	BUL	Nikola Kolev (on loan at Etar Veliko Tarnovo)
25	DF	FRA	Alexandre Barthe (released)
27	FW	BUL	Radoslav Zhivkov (on loan at Litex Lovech)
27	FW	BUL	Georgi Minchev (on loan at Tsarsko Selo)
28	DF	BUL	Plamen Galabov (on loan at Etar Veliko Tarnovo)
33	GK	BUL	Georgi Kitanov (on loan at Cherno More Varna)
—	DF	BUL	Martin Achkov (on loan at Litex Lovech)
—	DF	BUL	Galin Minkov (on loan at Tsarsko Selo)
—	DF	BUL	Daniel Yordanov (to Litex Lovech)
—	MF	BUL	Reyan Daskalov (on loan at Tsarsko Selo)
—	MF	BUL	Nikolay Yankov (on loan at Litex Lovech)
—	MF	BUL	Petar D. Petrov (to Litex Lovech)
—	MF	BUL	Ivan Mitrev (to Litex Lovech)

=== Winter transfers ===
In: Note: Flags indicate national team as defined under FIFA eligibility rules; some limited exceptions apply. Players may hold more than one non-FIFA nationality.

No.	Pos.	Nation	Player
12	GK	BUL	Slavi Petrov (loan return from Litex Lovech)
19	DF	BUL	Ivan Turitsov (loan return from Litex Lovech)
22	FW	GAM	Ali Sowe (from (Italy) Chievo, previously on loan)
24	DF	POR	Nuno Tomás (on loan from (Portugal) Belenenses)

Out: Note: Flags indicate national team as defined under FIFA eligibility rules; some limited exceptions apply. Players may hold more than one non-FIFA nationality.

No.	Pos.	Nation	Player
9	FW	BRA	Maurides (to (China) Changchun Yatai)
11	DF	BUL	Stanislav Manolev (to Ludogorets)
18	MF	BUL	Aleksandar Georgiev (on loan at Etar Veliko Tarnovo, previously on loan at Septemvri Sofia)
19	FW	BUL	Kiril Despodov (to (Italy) Cagliari)
23	DF	BUL	Aleksandar Dyulgerov (to Septemvri Sofia)
27	DF	SVK	Boris Sekulić (to (Poland) Górnik Zabrze)
—	DF	BUL	Nikola Borisov (on loan at Litex Lovech)
—	DF	BUL	Galin Minkov (to Tsarsko Selo, previously on loan)
—	MF	BUL	Reyan Daskalov (to Tsarsko Selo, previously on loan)
—	FW	BUL	Georgi Minchev (to Tsarsko Selo, previously on loan)

== Preseason and friendlies ==
Win Draw Loss Fixtures

=== Preseason ===
18 June 2018 Friendly	CSKA	2−0	Etar	Pancharevo, Bulgaria
17:00 EEST	Henrique 61', 79'	Report		Stadium: Sporten kompleks Pancharevo

23 June 2018 Friendly	CSKA (Bulgaria)	3−0	(Japan) V-Varen Nagasaki	Jenbach, Austria
18:30 EEST	Tiago 21'; Malinov 42'; Gyasi 88'	Report		Stadium: Stadion Jenbach

27 June 2018 Friendly	CSKA (Bulgaria)	2−1	(Russia) Ufa	Kirchdorf in Tirol, Austria
19:00 EEST	Yordanov 24', 61'	Report	Igboun 33'	Stadium: Leerberg-Arena Kirchdorf

30 June 2018 Friendly	CSKA (Bulgaria)	0−0	(Ukraine) Shakhtar Donetsk	Kufstein, Austria
15:00 EEST		Report		Stadium: Kufstein-Arena

2 July 2018 Friendly	CSKA (Bulgaria)	3−3	(Denmark) Brøndby	Angerberg, Austria
19:00 EEST	Karanga 44'; Jorginho 61'; Tiago 63'	Report	Erceg 28', 42'; Frendrup 46'	Stadium: Sportplatz Angerberg

7 July 2018 Friendly	CSKA	1−1	Tsarsko Selo	Sofia, Bulgaria
16:00 EEST	Tiago 40'	Report	Minchev 4'	Stadium: Stadion Balgarska Armiya

=== Mid-season ===
16 January 2019 Friendly	CSKA (Bulgaria)	1−1	(Germany) Bochum	Marbella, Spain
16:00 EET	Malinov 75'	Report	Maier 63'	Stadium: La Dama de Noche

20 January 2019 Friendly	CSKA (Bulgaria)	1−3	(Hungary) Puskás Akadémia	La Línea, Spain
17:00 EET	Tiago 81'	Report	Vega 54'; Tamás 62'; Poór 65'	Stadium: Estadio Municipal

23 January 2019 Friendly	CSKA (Bulgaria)	1−0	(China) Shanghai Greenland Shenhua	Lamos De La Quinta, Spain
17:00 EET	Sowe 79'	Report		Stadium: Chincheta

28 January 2019 Friendly	CSKA (Bulgaria)	2−1	(Czech Republic) Viktoria Plzeň	Estepona, Spain
17:00 EET	Gyasi 44' (pen.); Henrique 82'	Report	Beauguel 37' (pen.)	Stadium: Complejo Deportivo Arroyo Enmedio

31 January 2019 Friendly	CSKA (Bulgaria)	2−3	(Czech Republic) Sparta Prague	Marbella, Spain
17:00 EET	Tiago 21' (pen.); Jorginho 41'	Report	Drchal 9'; Kanga 67' (pen.); Chipciu 81'	Stadium: La Dama de Noche

2 February 2019 Friendly	CSKA (Bulgaria)	0−3	(Ukraine) Dynamo Kyiv	Marbella, Spain
17:00 EET		Report	Tsyhankov 3'; Verbič 35'; Andriyevskyi 89'	Stadium: La Dama de Noche

9 February 2019 Friendly	CSKA	0−1	Etar	Sofia, Bulgaria
15:00 EET		Report	Bojaj 34'	Stadium: Stadion Balgarska Armiya; Referee: Ivo Andreev (Sofia)

== Competitions ==
=== Parva Liga ===
==== Regular Stage ====
===== League table =====
Pos	Team	Pld	W	D	L	GF	GA	GD	Pts	Qualification
1	Ludogorets Razgrad	26	19	5	2	53	14	+39	62	Qualification for the Championship round
2	CSKA Sofia	26	18	3	5	47	14	+33	57	Qualification for the Championship round
3	Levski Sofia	26	17	3	6	51	24	+27	54	Qualification for the Championship round
4	Botev Plovdiv	26	13	6	7	39	21	+18	45	Qualification for the Championship round
5	Cherno More	26	12	6	8	36	34	+2	42	Qualification for the Championship round

Source: Soccerway
Rules for classification: 1) Points; 2) Head-to-head points; 3) Head-to-head goal difference; 4) Head-to-head goals scored; 5) Head-to-head away goals scored (only if two teams); 6) Goal difference; 7) Goals scored; 8) Fairplay ranking; 9) Draw.

===== Results summary =====
Overall								Home						Away					
Pld	W	D	L	GF	GA	GD	Pts	W	D	L	GF	GA	GD	W	D	L	GF	GA	GD
26	18	3	5	47	14	+33	57	11	1	1	32	7	+25	7	2	4	15	7	+8

Last updated: 16 March 2019.
Source: See results

===== Results by round =====
Round	1	2	3	4	5	6	7	8	9	10	11	12	13	14	15	16	17	18	19	20	21	22	23	24	25	26
Ground	H	A	H	H	A	H	A	H	A	H	A	H	A	A	H	A	A	H	A	H	A	H	A	H	A	H
Result	W	W	W	W	L	W	D	W	W	L	W	W	D	W	W	W	L	D	W	W	L	W	L	W	W	W
Position	1	1	1	1	2	2	2	1	1	3	3	3	3	3	2	2	2	2	2	2	2	2	3	3	2	2

Source: See Results
A = Away; H = Home; W = Win; D = Draw; L = Loss

===== Results =====
22 July 2018 1	CSKA	2−0	Lokomotiv	Sofia
20:45 EEST	Maurides 52'; Jorginho 62'; Sekulić (yellow card) 72'	Report	Dzhalilov (yellow card) 3'; Umarbayev (yellow card) 21'; Karagaren (yellow card) 45+2'; Bouhna (yellow card) 79'	Stadium: Stadion Balgarska Armiya; Attendance: 2,750; Referee: Stefan Apostolov (Simitli)

29 July 2018 2	Vitosha	0−2	CSKA	Sofia
20:45 EEST	Gochev (yellow card) 34'	Report	Tiago 10'; Pinto 17'; Bodurov (yellow card) 31'	Stadium: Natsionalen stadion Vasil Levski; Attendance: 1,400; Referee: Stanislav Stavrov (Veliko Tarnovo)

5 August 2018 3	CSKA	3−0	Dunav	Sofia
20:45 EEST	Maurides 39'; Kovachev 45+2' (o.g.); Despodov 56'; Chorbadzhiyski (yellow card) 84'	Report		Stadium: Stadion Balgarska Armiya; Attendance: 2,600; Referee: Vladimir Valkov (Plovdiv)

12 August 2018 4	CSKA	2−1	Slavia	Sofia
20:45 EEST	Pinto (yellow card) 37'; Despodov (yellow card) 44'; Maurides 45+3', 90'	Report	Stanisavljević (yellow card) 36'; Gamakov (yellow card) 44'; Karabelyov 66', (yellow card) 72'; Shokolarov (yellow card) 90+4'	Stadium: Stadion Balgarska Armiya; Attendance: 2,130; Referee: Volen Chinkov (Sofia)

19 August 2018 5	Ludogorets	1−0	CSKA	Razgrad
21:00 EEST	Wanderson 21'; Moți (yellow card) 40'; Dyakov (yellow card) 68'; Marcelinho (yellow card) 78'; Lukoki (yellow card) 90+1'	Report	Malinov (yellow card) 5'; Bikel (yellow card) 34'; Tiago (yellow card) 45+1'; Lyaskov (yellow card) 67'	Stadium: Ludogorets Arena; Attendance: 7,600; Referee: Nikolay Yordanov (Sofia)

26 August 2018 6	CSKA	4−0	Vereya	Sofia
21:00 EEST	Despodov 17', 47'; Pinto (yellow card) 28'; Gyasi 68'; Maurides 85'	Report	Jørgensen (yellow card) 10'; Stanchev (yellow card) 72'	Stadium: Stadion Balgarska Armiya; Attendance: 1,350; Referee: Ivaylo Stoyanov (Petrich)

1 September 2018 7	Botev Plovdiv	0−0	CSKA	Plovdiv
18:45 EEST	Baltanov (yellow card) 20'; Terziev (yellow card) 90+1'	Report	Despodov (yellow card) 26'; Lyaskov (yellow card) 44'; Bodurov (yellow card) 90+3'	Stadium: Futbolen complex Botev 1912; Attendance: 3,000; Referee: Volen Chinkov (Sofia)

15 September 2018 8	CSKA	3−1	Cherno More	Sofia
20:00 EEST	Gyasi 1'; Sekulić (yellow card) 25'; Despodov 39'; Pinto 58'; Lyaskov (yellow card) 88'; Manolev (yellow card) 90+4'	Report	Černiauskas 14' (o.g.); Panayotov (yellow card) 43'; Hassani (yellow card) 90+4'; Makendzhiev (yellow card) 90+4'	Stadium: Stadion Balgarska Armiya; Attendance: 3,480; Referee: Stefan Apostolov (Simitli)

22 September 2018 9	Botev Vratsa	0−2	CSKA	Montana
20:00 EEST	Gadzhev (yellow card) 4'; Apostolov (yellow card) 23'; Bojinov (penalty missed) 54'; Mihaylov (yellow card) 69'	Report	Bojinov 15' (o.g.); Pereira (yellow card) 25'; Sowe 38'; Chorbadzhiyski (yellow card) 53'	Stadium: Stadion Ogosta; Attendance: 3,750; Referee: Valentin Zhelezov (Burgas)

29 September 2018 10	CSKA	0−1	Levski	Sofia
17:00 EEST	Chorbadzhiyski (yellow card) 16'; Pinto (yellow card) 42'; Tiago (yellow card) 45'; Despodov (yellow card) 85'; Bikel (yellow card) 86'; Bodurov (yellow card) 90'	Report	Černiauskas 30' (o.g.); Thiam (yellow card) 85'; Goranov (yellow card) 86'; Cvetković (yellow card) 90+2'	Stadium: Natsionalen stadion Vasil Levski; Attendance: 23,000; Referee: Ivaylo Stoyanov (Petrich)

6 October 2018 11	Septemvri	0−3	CSKA	Sofia
17:30 EEST	Galchev (yellow card) 38'; Meledje (yellow card) 42'; Stoichkov (yellow card) 43'; Benga (yellow card) 43'	Report	Maurides 37' (pen.), (yellow card) 52'; Tiago 64'; Lyaskov (yellow card) 81'; Manolev 90+2'	Stadium: Natsionalen stadion Vasil Levski; Attendance: 820; Referee: Georgi Davidov (Veliko Tarnovo)

21 October 2018 12	CSKA	3−0	Etar	Sofia
20:00 EEST	Chorbadzhiyski 28'; Jorginho 49'; Despodov 84'	Report	Sarmov (yellow card) 48'	Stadium: Stadion Balgarska Armiya; Attendance: 6,400; Referee: Vladimir Valkov (Plovdiv)

27 October 2018 13	Beroe	1−1	CSKA	Stara Zagora
15:00 EEST	Kamburov 35'; Bandalovski (yellow card) 53'; Raynov (yellow card) 63'; Tsvetkov (yellow card) 72'	Report	Tiago 27'; Sekulić (yellow card) 34'; Maurides (penalty missed) 54'; Bodurov (yellow card) 55'; Jorginho (yellow card) 90+2'	Stadium: Stadion Beroe; Attendance: 6,900; Referee: Nikola Popov (Sofia)

3 November 2018 14	Lokomotiv	0−1	CSKA	Plovdiv
15:00 EET	Posinković (yellow card) 36'; Banović (yellow card) 49'; Aralica (yellow card) 68'; Raykov (yellow card) 90+3'	Report	Pinto (yellow card) 25'; Despodov 57', (yellow card) 73'; Bikel (yellow card) 90+3'	Stadium: Stadion Lokomotiv; Attendance: 3,100; Referee: Stefan Apostolov (Simitli)

9 November 2018 15	CSKA	3−0	Vitosha	Sofia
17:45 EET	Malinov (yellow card) 71'; Maurides 79', 90+3'; Despodov 90'	Report	Lazarov (yellow card) 24'; Gochev (yellow card) 39'; Vasilev (yellow card) 62'	Stadium: Stadion Balgarska Armiya; Attendance: 950; Referee: Nikola Popov (Sofia)

24 November 2018 16	Dunav	0−2	CSKA	Ruse
15:00 EET	Popadiyn (yellow card) 39'	Report	Maurides 40'; Gyasi 47'	Stadium: Gradski stadion Attendance: 2,040; Referee: Stanislav Todorov (Shumen)

2 December 2018 17	Slavia	1−0	CSKA	Sofia
17:00 EET	Petkov (yellow card) 21'; S. Aleksandrov (yellow card) 34' (yellow-red card) 59'; Karabelyov 51', (yellow card) 88'; G. Ivanov (yellow card) 89'; Stergiakis (yellow card) 90'	Report	Gyasi (yellow card) 21'; Geferson (yellow card) 30'	Stadium: Natsionalen stadion Vasil Levski; Attendance: 790; Referee: Volen Chinkov (Sofia)

6 December 2018 18	CSKA	1−1	Ludogorets	Sofia
17:30 EET	Pinto (yellow card) 25'; Geferson (yellow card) 57'; Manolev (yellow card) 58'; Despodov 67'; Malinov (yellow card) 69'; Antov (yellow card) 90+3'	Report	Cicinho (yellow card) 11' (yellow-red card) 89'; Keșerü 29'; Marcelinho (yellow card) 82'	Stadium: Stadion Balgarska Armiya; Attendance: 6,900; Referee: Nikolay Yordanov (Sofia)

9 December 2018 19	Vereya	0−1	CSKA	Stara Zagora
15:00 EET	Košút (yellow card) 38'	Report	Tiago 27'; Chorbadzhiyski (yellow card) 59'	Stadium: Trace Arena; Attendance: 750; Referee: Vladimir Valkov (Plovdiv)

16 December 2018 20	CSKA	2−1	Botev Plovdiv	Sofia
19:00 EET	Sowe 14', 28'; Tiago (yellow card) 23'; Antov (yellow card) 90+2'	Report	Baltanov (yellow card) 16'; Yusein 68', (yellow card) 72'	Stadium: Stadion Balgarska Armiya; Attendance: 510; Referee: Dragomir Draganov (Varna)
Note: The game was originally scheduled to start at 17:30, but was postponed initially with 30 minutes, and then with further 60 minutes due to heavy snowfall.

16 February 2019 21	Cherno More	2−0	CSKA	Varna
15:00 EET	N'Dongala 7', (yellow card) 8'; Panayotov (yellow card) 21' (yellow-red card) 80'; Panov (yellow card) 30'; Genev (yellow card) 39'; Vasilev 62'; Vitanov (yellow card) 63'; Dimov (yellow card) 89'	Report	Pinto (yellow card) 27'; Chorbadzhiyski (yellow card) 57'; Evandro (yellow card) 66'; Malinov (yellow card) 85'; Bikel (yellow card) 90'	Stadium: Stadion Ticha; Attendance: 6,000; Referee: Stefan Apostolov (Simitli)

19 February 2019 22	CSKA	2−1	Botev Vratsa	Sofia
17:30 EET	Gyasi 48'; Malinov (yellow card) 54'; Sowe 56'; Atanasov (yellow card) 76'	Report	Gadzhev (yellow card) 44'; Genov (yellow card) 58'; Stoev 89'	Stadium: Stadion Balgarska Armiya; Attendance: 1,350; Referee: Stanislav Stavrov (Veliko Tarnovo)

24 February 2019 23	Levski	1−0	CSKA	Sofia
13:00 EET	Paulinho (yellow card) 31'; Goranov (yellow card) 43'; Pereira 45+2' (o.g.); Thiam (yellow card) 56'; Cvetković (yellow card) 69'	Report	Gyasi (red card) 43'; Chorbadzhiyski (yellow card) 63'; Turitsov (yellow card) 66'; Pereira (yellow card) 90+5'	Stadium: Natsionalen stadion Vasil Levski; Attendance: 11,000; Referee: Vladimir Valkov (Plovdiv)

2 March 2019 24	CSKA	5−1	Septemvri	Sofia
17:30 EET	Sowe 2' (pen.), 23', 74'; Jorginho 18'; Henrique 28'; Bikel (yellow card) 71'; Antov (yellow card) 82'	Report	Stoichkov (yellow card) 33'; Alves (yellow card) 40'; Glišić (yellow card) 52'; Bashliev (yellow card) 64'; I. Dimitrov 89'	Stadium: Stadion Balgarska Armiya; Attendance: 850; Referee: Petar Kirilov (Dobrich)

9 March 2019 25	Etar	1−3	CSKA	Veliko Tarnovo
17:30 EET	Skerlev (yellow card) 50'; K. Stoyanov (yellow card) 61'; Mladenov 75'	Report	Jorginho (yellow card) 31', (goal) 65'; Sowe 69', 81'	Stadium: Stadion Ivaylo; Attendance: 7,600; Referee: Nikola Popov (Sofia)

16 March 2019 26	CSKA	2−0	Beroe	Sofia
17:45 EET	Tiago 18'; Turitsov (yellow card) 82'; Bikel (yellow card) 83'; Alkan 90+2' (o.g.)	Report	Minchev (yellow card) 49'; Leoni (yellow card) 52'; Zhelev (yellow card) 74'	Stadium: Stadion Balgarska Armiya; Attendance: 2,950; Referee: Nikolay Yordanov (Sofia)

==== Championship round ====
===== League table =====
Pos	Team	Pld	W	D	L	GF	GA	GD	Pts	Qualification
1	Ludogorets Razgrad (C)	36	23	10	3	67	19	+48	79	Qualification for the Champions League first qualifying round
2	CSKA Sofia	36	24	6	6	57	17	+40	78	Qualification for the Europa League first qualifying round
3	Levski Sofia (O)	36	20	6	10	64	37	+27	66	Qualification for the European play-off final
4	Beroe	36	16	10	10	42	30	+12	58	
5	Cherno More	36	15	7	14	44	51	−7	52	
6	Botev Plovdiv	36	14	8	14	44	36	+8	50	

Source: Soccerway
Rules for classification: 1) Points; 2) Head-to-head points; 3) Head-to-head goal difference; 4) Head-to-head goals scored; 5) Head-to-head away goals scored (only if two teams); 6) Goal difference; 7) Goals scored; 8) Fairplay ranking; 9) Draw.
(C) Champions; (O) Play-off winners

===== Results summary =====
Overall								Home						Away					
Pld	W	D	L	GF	GA	GD	Pts	W	D	L	GF	GA	GD	W	D	L	GF	GA	GD
10	6	3	1	10	3	+7	21	3	2	0	4	0	+4	3	1	1	6	3	+3

Last updated: 24 May 2019.
Source: See results

===== Results by round =====
Round	1	2	3	4	5	6	7	8	9	10
Ground	H	A	H	H	A	A	H	A	A	H
Result	W	D	W	D	L	W	D	W	W	W
Position	2	2	2	2	2	2	2	2	2	2

Source: See Results
A = Away; H = Home; W = Win; D = Draw; L = Loss

===== Results =====
30 March 2019 27	CSKA	1−0	Cherno More	Sofia
20:30 EET	Atanasov (yellow card) 22'; Bikel (yellow card) 48'; Sowe 83' (pen.)	Report	Stanchev (yellow card) 19'; Fennouche (yellow card) 22'; Rodrigo (yellow card) 76'; Dimov (yellow card) 82'; Vasilev (yellow card) 85'; Genev (yellow card) 87'	Stadium: Stadion Balgarska Armiya; Attendance: 2,400; Referee: Stefan Apostolov (Simitli)

6 April 2019 28	Ludogorets	0−0	CSKA	Razgrad
17:15 EEST	Dyakov (yellow card) 73'	Report	Geferson (yellow card) 71'	Stadium: Ludogorets Arena; Attendance: 6,300; Referee: Dragomir Draganov (Varna)

13 April 2019 29	CSKA	2−0	Beroe	Sofia
20:00 EEST	Evandro 13' (pen.), (yellow card) 35'; Turitsov (yellow card) 36'; Černiauskas (yellow card) 85'; Malinov 89'	Report	Tsvetkov (yellow card) 8'; Baranov (yellow card) 12'; Ohene (yellow card) 32'; Meledje (yellow card) 33'; Alkan (yellow card) 41'; Kamburov (yellow card) 76'; Eugénio (yellow card) 81'	Stadium: Stadion Balgarska Armiya; Attendance: 2,300; Referee: Valentin Zhelezov (Burgas)

20 April 2019 30	CSKA	0−0	Levski	Sofia
17:15 EEST	Malinov (yellow card) 62'; Antov (yellow card) 67'; Bodurov (yellow card) 86'	Report	Milanov (yellow card) 13'; Reis (yellow card) 57'; Raynov (yellow card) 79'; Vaštšuk (yellow card) 89'; M. D. Petkov (yellow card) 90+2'	Stadium: Natsionalen stadion Vasil Levski; Attendance: 15,900; Referee: Stanislav Todorov (Shumen)

29 April 2019 31	Botev Plovdiv	2−0	CSKA	Plovdiv
20:00 EEST	Ebert (yellow card) 30'; V. Shopov (yellow card) 70'; Pirgov (yellow card) 79'; K. Dimitrov (yellow card) 79'; Dobrev (yellow card) 81'; Doré 83', (yellow card) 83'; Nedelev 90+4'	Report	Tiago (yellow card) 22'; Henrique (yellow card) 32'; Evandro (yellow card) 38'; Malinov (yellow card) 52'; Bikel (yellow card) 55'; Bodurov (yellow card) 56'	Stadium: Futbolen complex Botev 1912; Attendance: 2,900; Referee: Ivaylo Stoyanov (Petrich)

4 May 2019 32	Cherno More	1−3	CSKA	Varna
17:30 EEST	Konongo (yellow card) 17'; Panayotov 66'; Stanchev (yellow card) 90+2'	Report	Bodurov (yellow card) 21'; Geferson (yellow card) 31'; Tiago 33', (yellow card) 87'; Gyasi 52'; Atanasov (yellow card) 74'; Sowe 75'	Stadium: Stadion Ticha; Attendance: 4,700; Referee: Vladimir Valkov (Plovdiv)

11 May 2019 33	CSKA	0−0	Ludogorets	Sofia
20:15 EEST	Sowe (penalty missed) 8'; Geferson (yellow card) 39'; Malinov (yellow card) 64' (yellow-red card) 90+3'	Report	Świerczok (yellow card) 18'; Dyakov (yellow card) 42' (yellow-red card) 90+3'; Lukoki (yellow card) 83'	Stadium: Stadion Balgarska Armiya; Attendance: 11,000; Referee: Georgi Kabakov (Plovdiv)

18 May 2019 34	Beroe	0−1	CSKA	Stara Zagora
20:30 EEST	Meledje (yellow card) 35'; Eugénio (yellow card) 48'; Alkan (yellow card) 68'	Report	Tiago 16', (yellow card) 72'; Jorginho (yellow card) 35'; Chorbadzhiyski (yellow card) 48'; Bikel (yellow card) 63'; Černiauskas (yellow card) 90+2'	Stadium: Stadion Beroe; Attendance: 2,900; Referee: Nikola Popov (Sofia)

21 May 2019 35	Levski	0−2	CSKA	Sofia
18:00 EEST	Milanov (yellow card) 66'; Reis (yellow card) 78' (yellow-red card) 84'; M. D. Petkov (yellow card) 90+2'	Report	Malinov (yellow card) 55'; Tiago 70'; Evandro 86'; Chorbadzhiyski (yellow card) 87'	Stadium: Natsionalen stadion Vasil Levski; Attendance: 11,200; Referee: Dragomir Draganov (Varna)

24 May 2019 36	CSKA	1−0	Botev Plovdiv	Sofia
20:00 EEST	Atanasov (yellow card) 42'; Chorbadzhiyski (yellow card) 85'; Jorginho 90+1'	Report	Pirgov (yellow card) 45+2'	Stadium: Stadion Balgarska Armiya; Referee: Vladimir Valkov (Plovdiv)

=== Bulgarian Cup ===
25 September 2018 First Round	Montana	0−2	CSKA	Montana
19:00 EEST	Popov (yellow card) 47'; Yordanov (yellow card) 53'; A. Iliev (yellow card) 57'; Mihov (yellow card) 66'	Report	Evandro 52'; Manolev (yellow card) 64'; Sekulić (yellow card) 67'; Bikel (yellow card) 77'; Sowe 90+2'	Stadium: Stadion Ogosta; Attendance: 3,370; Referee: Radoslav Gidzhenov (Plovdiv)

30 October 2018 Second Round	CSKA	3−1	Vitosha	Sofia
19:00 EET	Pinto 15'; Sowe 74', 76'	Report	Tsankov (yellow card) 71'; Kochilov (yellow card) 77'; Milchev 90+1'	Stadium: Stadion Balgarska Armiya; Attendance: 930; Referee: Petar Kirilov (Dobrich)

3 April 2019 Quarterfinal	Ludogorets	0−1	CSKA	Razgrad
18:30 EEST	Moți (yellow card) 15'; Cicinho (yellow card) 45'; Manolev (yellow card) 66'; Góralski (yellow card) 68'; Grigore (yellow card) 90+1'	Report	Pinto 30', (yellow card) 56'; Bikel (yellow card) 39'; Malinov (yellow card) 61'; Tomás (yellow card) 70'; Sowe (yellow card) 77'; Evandro (yellow card) 90+2'; Černiauskas (yellow card) 90+4'	Stadium: Ludogorets Arena; Attendance: 5,800; Referee: Nikolay Yordanov (Sofia)

17 April 2019 Semifinal Leg 1	Botev Plovdiv	3−2	CSKA	Plovdiv
19:00 EEST	Nedelev 14' (pen.); Vutov 26'; Terziev (yellow card) 45'; A. Tonev (yellow card) 59'; K. Dimitrov (yellow card) 67'; Pirgov (yellow card) 72'; Doré 84'	Report	Bikel (yellow card) 17' (yellow-red card) 53'; Turitsov (yellow card) 18'; Sowe 33' (pen.), (yellow card) 61'; Pinto 69'	Stadium: Futbolen complex Botev 1912; Attendance: 3,500; Referee: Nikolay Yordanov (Sofia)

24 April 2019 Semifinal Leg 2	CSKA	3−3 (5−6 agg.)	Botev Plovdiv	Sofia
19:00 EEST	Sowe 49', 85' (pen.); Bikel (yellow card) 62'; Evandro (yellow card) 72', (goal) 74'; Pinto (yellow card) 81'; Antov (yellow card) 90+3'	Report	Nedelev 22'; Filipov (yellow card) 24' (yellow-red card) 53'; Baltanov 27', (yellow card) 53'; V. Shopov (yellow card) 43'; Vutov (yellow card) 77' (red card) 84'; K. Dimitrov 88'	Stadium: Stadion Balgarska Armiya; Attendance: 12,700; Referee: Petar Kirilov (Dobrich)

=== UEFA Europa League ===
==== First qualifying round ====
12 July 2018 First leg	CSKA (Bulgaria)	1−0	(Latvia) Riga	Sofia, Bulgaria
20:45 EEST	Tiago 49'; Gyasi (yellow card) 71'; Sekulić (yellow card) 90+1'	Report	Bayenko (yellow card) 32'	Stadium: Stadion Balgarska Armiya; Attendance: 7,500; Referee: Mario Zebec (Croatia)

19 July 2018 Second leg	Riga (Latvia)	1−0 (a.e.t.) (1−1 agg.) (3−5 p)	(Bulgaria) CSKA	Riga, Latvia
19:30 EEST	Černomordijs 44'; Panić (yellow card) 63' (yellow-red card) 109'; Šarić (yellow card) 67'; Bayenko (yellow card) 108' (red card) 130'; Vaštšuk (red card) 130'	Report	Tiago (yellow card) 27' (yellow-red card) 74'; Despodov (yellow card) 33', (penalty missed) 89'; Malinov (yellow card) 112' (red card) 130'; Bodurov (red card) 130'	Stadium: Skonto stadions Attendance: 3,100; Referee: Furkat Atazhanov (Kazakhstan)
	Penalties
	Lemajić (penalty missed); Primão (penalty scored); Kārkliņš (penalty scored); Bayenko (penalty scored)		(penalty scored) Malinov; (penalty scored) Bodurov; (penalty scored) Geferson; (penalty scored) Gyasi; (penalty scored) Despodov

==== Second qualifying round ====
26 July 2018 First leg	CSKA (Bulgaria)	3−0	(Austria) Admira Wacker Mödling	Sofia, Bulgaria
20:00 EEST	Despodov 29', 34'; Maurides 38' (pen.); Pereira (yellow card) 45'	Report	Spasić (yellow card) 37'; Jakoliš (yellow card) 43'	Stadium: Stadion Balgarska Armiya; Attendance: 6,200; Referee: John Beaton (Scotland)

2 August 2018 Second leg	Admira Wacker Mödling (Austria)	1−3 (1−6 agg.)	(Bulgaria) CSKA	Maria Enzersdorf, Austria
20:00 EEST	Aiwu (yellow card) 18'; Jakoliš (yellow card) 43'; Bakış 55'; Schmidt (yellow card) 69'	Report	Maurides 14', 53'; Jorginho 80'	Stadium: BSFZ-Arena; Attendance: 2,400; Referee: Pol van Boekel (Netherlands)

==== Third qualifying round ====
9 August 2018 First leg	CSKA (Bulgaria)	1−2	(Denmark) Copenhagen	Sofia, Bulgaria
20:45 EEST	Maurides 15'; Chorbadzhiyski (red card) 41'; Lyaskov (yellow card) 54'; Pinto (yellow card) 73'; Bikel (yellow card) 90+2'	Report	Falk (yellow card) 34'; Vavro 64'; Kodro (yellow card) 66', (goal) 74' (pen.)	Stadium: Natsionalen stadion Vasil Levski; Attendance: 21,100; Referee: Bart Vertenten (Belgium)
Note: CSKA will play their third qualifying round home match at Natsionalen stadion Vasil Levski, Sofia, instead of their regular stadium Balgarska Armiya, Sofia, which does not meet UEFA requirements for this stage of the tournament.

16 August 2018 Second leg	Copenhagen (Denmark)	2−1 (4−2 agg.)	(Bulgaria) CSKA	Copenhagen, Denmark
19:30 EEST	N'Doye 23', 64'; Greguš (yellow card) 26'	Report	Pereira (yellow card) 20'; Evandro 58'; Malinov (yellow card) 71'; Bodurov (yellow card) 77'	Stadium: Parken; Attendance: 10,078; Referee: Halil Umut Meler (Turkey)

== Squad stats ==
=== Appearances and goals ===
No.	Pos.	Nat.	Name	Totals		Parva Liga		Bulgarian Cup		Europa League	
No.	Pos.	Nat.	Name	Apps	Goals	Apps	Goals	Apps	Goals	Apps	Goals
1	GK	(Croatia) CRO	Dante Stipica	4	-3	2	-2	2	-1	0	0
2	DF	(Bulgaria) BUL	Stoycho Atanasov	12	0	6+4	0	2	0	0	0
3	DF	(Brazil) BRA	Geferson	21	0	15+1	0	1	0	4	0
4	DF	(Bulgaria) BUL	Bozhidar Chorbadzhiyski	37	1	27+2	1	3	0	5	0
5	DF	(Bulgaria) BUL	Nikolay Bodurov	36	0	29	0	4	0	3	0
6	MF	(Portugal) POR	Rúben Pinto	43	5	30+3	2	4	3	6	0
7	MF	(Guinea-Bissau) GBS	Jorginho	42	6	19+13	5	4+1	0	4+1	1
8	MF	(Ghana) GHA	Edwin Gyasi	38	5	21+9	5	1+1	0	3+3	0
10	FW	(Brazil) BRA	Evandro	25	5	8+12	2	1+3	2	0+1	1
12	GK	(Bulgaria) BUL	Slavi Petrov	0	0	0	0	0	0	0	0
14	DF	(Bulgaria) BUL	Angel Lyaskov	18	0	11+3	0	0+1	0	2+1	0
15	MF	(Bulgaria) BUL	Kristiyan Malinov	39	1	28+3	1	5	0	3	0
16	MF	(Portugal) POR	Janio Bikel	40	0	18+12	0	4+1	0	3+2	0
17	FW	(Brazil) BRA	Henrique	19	1	9+5	1	3	0	1+1	0
18	FW	(Bulgaria) BUL	Martin Smolenski	2	0	0+2	0	0	0	0	0
19	DF	(Bulgaria) BUL	Ivan Turitsov	16	0	13	0	3	0	0	0
20	MF	(Portugal) POR	Tiago Rodrigues	40	9	30+3	8	2	0	5	1
22	FW	(The Gambia) GAM	Ali Sowe	33	17	19+9	11	3+2	6	0	0
24	DF	(Portugal) POR	Nuno Tomás	15	0	12	0	2+1	0	0	0
25	DF	(Cape Verde) CPV	Steven Pereira	13	0	7+1	0	0	0	4+1	0
26	DF	(Bulgaria) BUL	Valentin Antov	27	0	10+8	0	2+2	0	2+3	0
27	MF	(Bulgaria) BUL	Andrey Yordanov	1	0	0+1	0	0	0	0	0
28	FW	(Bulgaria) BUL	Borislav Budinov	1	0	0+1	0	0	0	0	0
30	GK	(Lithuania) LTU	Vytautas Černiauskas	43	-27	34	-15	3	-6	6	-6
Players away from the club on loan:
21	FW	(Bulgaria) BUL	Tonislav Yordanov	2	0	0	0	0	0	0+2	0
28	DF	(Bulgaria) BUL	Plamen Galabov	0	0	0	0	0	0	0	0
33	GK	(Bulgaria) BUL	Georgi Kitanov	0	0	0	0	0	0	0	0
Players who appeared for CSKA Sofia that left during the season:
9	FW	(Brazil) BRA	Maurides	27	13	16+5	9	2	0	4	4
11	DF	(Bulgaria) BUL	Stanislav Manolev	14	1	7+4	1	2	0	0+1	0
19	FW	(Bulgaria) BUL	Kiril Despodov	22	10	14+2	8	1	0	5	2
23	DF	(Bulgaria) BUL	Aleksandar Dyulgerov	4	0	0+2	0	0	0	0+2	0
27	DF	(Slovakia) SVK	Boris Sekulić	19	0	11+1	0	1	0	6	0

As of 24 May 2019

=== Goal scorers ===
Place	Position	Nation	Number	Name	Parva Liga	Bulgarian Cup	Europa League	Total
1	FW	(The Gambia)	22	Ali Sowe	11	6	0	17
2	FW	(Brazil)	9	Maurides	9	0	4	13
3	FW	(Bulgaria)	19	Kiril Despodov	8	0	2	10
4	MF	(Portugal)	20	Tiago Rodrigues	8	0	1	9
5	MF	(Guinea-Bissau)	7	Jorginho	5	0	1	6
6	MF	(Portugal)	6	Rúben Pinto	2	3	0	5
6	MF	(Ghana)	8	Edwin Gyasi	5	0	0	5
6	FW	(Brazil)	10	Evandro	2	2	1	5
9	DF	(Bulgaria)	4	Bozhidar Chorbadzhiyski	1	0	0	1
9	DF	(Bulgaria)	11	Stanislav Manolev	1	0	0	1
9	MF	(Bulgaria)	15	Kristiyan Malinov	1	0	0	1
9	MF	(Brazil)	17	Henrique	1	0	0	1
				Own goal	3	0	0	3
TOTALS					57	11	9	77

As of 24 May 2019

=== Disciplinary record ===
Number	Nation	Position	Name	Parva Liga		Bulgarian Cup		Europa League		Total	
Number	Nation	Position	Name	Yellow card	Red card	Yellow card	Red card	Yellow card	Red card	Yellow card	Red card
2	(Bulgaria)	DF	Stoycho Atanasov	4	0	0	0	0	0	4	0
3	(Brazil)	DF	Geferson	5	0	0	0	0	0	5	0
4	(Bulgaria)	DF	Bozhidar Chorbadzhiyski	9	0	0	0	0	1	9	1
5	(Bulgaria)	DF	Nikolay Bodurov	7	0	0	0	1	1	8	1
6	(Portugal)	MF	Rúben Pinto	6	0	2	0	1	0	9	0
7	(Guinea-Bissau)	MF	Jorginho	3	0	0	0	0	0	3	0
8	(Ghana)	MF	Edwin Gyasi	1	1	0	0	1	0	2	1
10	(Brazil)	FW	Evandro	3	0	2	0	0	0	5	0
14	(Bulgaria)	DF	Angel Lyaskov	4	0	0	0	1	0	5	0
15	(Bulgaria)	MF	Kristiyan Malinov	10	1	1	0	2	1	13	2
16	(Portugal)	MF	Janio Bikel	9	0	5	1	1	0	15	1
17	(Brazil)	MF	Henrique	1	0	0	0	0	0	1	0
19	(Bulgaria)	DF	Ivan Turitsov	3	0	1	0	0	0	4	0
20	(Portugal)	MF	Tiago Rodrigues	6	0	0	0	2	1	8	1
22	(The Gambia)	FW	Ali Sowe	0	0	2	0	0	0	2	0
24	(Portugal)	DF	Nuno Tomás	0	0	1	0	0	0	1	0
25	(Cape Verde)	DF	Steven Pereira	2	0	0	0	2	0	4	0
26	(Bulgaria)	DF	Valentin Antov	4	0	1	0	0	0	5	0
30	(Lithuania)	GK	Vytautas Černiauskas	2	0	1	0	0	0	3	0
Players away on loan or who left CSKA Sofia during the season:
9	(Brazil)	FW	Maurides	1	0	0	0	0	0	1	0
11	(Bulgaria)	DF	Stanislav Manolev	2	0	1	0	0	0	3	0
19	(Bulgaria)	MF	Kiril Despodov	4	0	0	0	1	0	5	0
27	(Slovakia)	DF	Boris Sekulić	3	0	1	0	1	0	5	0
			TOTALS	89	2	18	1	13	4	119	7

As of 24 May 2019

== See also ==
- PFC CSKA Sofia
