= Martin Petkov =

Martin Petkov may refer to:

- Martin Petkov (footballer, born 2001), Bulgarian football winger for Lokomotiv Gorna Oryahovitsa on loan from Levski Sofia
- Martin Petkov (footballer, born 2002), Bulgarian football winger for Levski Sofia
