= Jorginho (footballer, born 1995) =

Bissau-Guinean footballer

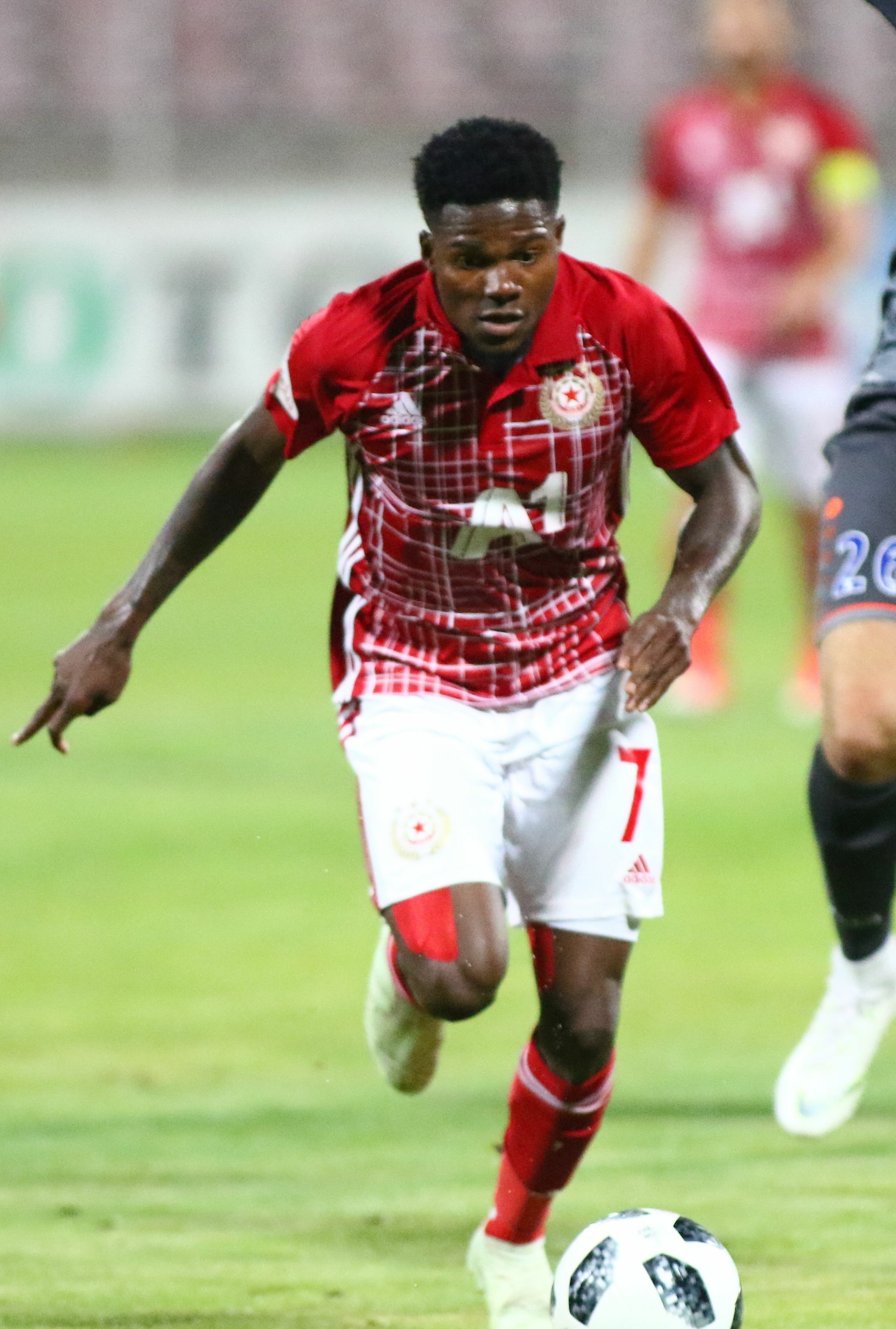
- Jorginho with CSKA Sofia in 2018

Personal information
- Full name: Jorge Fernando Barbosa Intima
- Date of birth: 21 September 1995 (age 31)
- Place of birth: Bissau, Guinea-Bissau
- Height: 1.69 m (5 ft 7 in)
- Position: Winger

Team information
- Current team: Panserraikos
- Number: 17

Youth career
- AF Vitalaise
- 2012–2015: Manchester City

Senior career*
Years	Team	Apps	(Gls)
2015–2016	Manchester City	0	(0)
2016–2017	Arouca	14	(5)
2017	→ Saint-Étienne (loan)	5	(1)
2017	→ Saint-Étienne B (loan)	3	(1)
2017–2019	Saint-Étienne	0	(0)
2017–2018	→ Chaves (loan)	20	(1)
2018–2019	→ CSKA Sofia (loan)	32	(5)
2019–2023	Ludogorets Razgrad	33	(9)
2020–2021	→ Wadi Degla (loan)	24	(0)
2021–2022	→ Wisła Płock (loan)	22	(1)
2023	Ordabasy	13	(0)
2024–2025	Torpedo Kutaisi	22	(1)
2025–2026	Omonia Aradippou	44	(8)
2026–	Panserraikos	2	(0)

International career^{‡}
2014	Portugal U19	10	(3)
2018–	Guinea-Bissau	29	(5)
- * Club domestic league appearances and goals as of 20 September 2026 ‡ National team caps and goals as of 14:50, 22 April 2025 (UTC)

Jorge Fernando Barbosa Intima (born 21 September 1995), known as Jorginho, is a Bissau-Guinean professional footballer who plays as a winger for Super League Greece 2 club Panserraikos and the Guinea-Bissau national team.

== Club career ==
Born in Bissau, Guinea-Bissau, Jorginho came through the youth ranks at Manchester City after signing at the age of 17. After agreeing to a one-year contract extension on 7 July 2015, he was limited to reserve team football.

In the last minutes of the 2016 winter transfer window, Jorginho moved to Portugal and joined F.C. Arouca on a three-and-a-half-year deal. He made his Primeira Liga debut on 7 February, coming on as a 78th-minute substitute in a 2–1 away win against FC Porto.

Jorginho scored a hat-trick in a 4–1 away victory over Moreirense F.C. on 17 December 2016. In the following transfer window he was transferred to AS Saint-Étienne of the French Ligue 1, who loaned him six months later to G.D. Chaves in a season-long move after acquiring him on a permanent basis.

On 19 June 2018, Jorginho signed with Bulgarian club PFC CSKA Sofia on loan until the end of the campaign. One year later, he agreed to a permanent contract at PFC Ludogorets Razgrad of the same country.

Jorginho joined Wadi Degla SC of the Egyptian Premier League in late November 2020, on loan with an option to buy.

== International career ==
Jorginho represented Portugal at youth level. He was part of the squad at the 2014 UEFA European Under-19 Championship, appearing in three games – including eight minutes in the final against Germany – for the eventual runners-up.

On 22 March 2018, Jorginho made his debut for his native Guinea-Bissau, starting in a 2–0 friendly defeat to Burkina Faso. He was part of the squad that appeared in the 2019 Africa Cup of Nations.

== Career statistics ==
=== Club ===
As of match played 5 May 2025

Appearances and goals by club, season and competition
Club	Season	League			National cup (Note: Includes FA Cup, Taça de Portugal, Coupe de France, Bulgarian Cup, Egypt Cup, Polish Cup, Kazakhstan Cup, Georgian Cup and Cypriot Cup)		League cup (Note: Includes EFL Cup, Taça da Liga and Coupe de la Ligue)		Continental		Other		Total	
Club	Season	Division	Apps	Goals	Apps	Goals	Apps	Goals	Apps	Goals	Apps	Goals	Apps	Goals
Manchester City	2015–16	Premier League	0	0	0	0	0	0	0	0	—		0	0
Arouca	2015–16	Primeira Liga	4	0	0	0	0	0	—		—		4	0
Arouca	2016–17	Primeira Liga	10	5	0	0	2	0	0	0	—		12	5
Arouca	Total		14	5	0	0	2	0	0	0	—		16	5
Saint-Étienne (loan)	2016–17	Ligue 1	5	1	0	0	0	0	2 (Note: Appearances in UEFA Europa League)	0	—		7	1
Saint-Étienne B (loan)	2016–17	CFA 2	3	1	—		—		—		—		3	1
Saint-Étienne	2017–18	Ligue 1	0	0	0	0	0	0	—		—		0	0
Saint-Étienne	2018–19	Ligue 1	0	0	0	0	0	0	—		—		0	0
Saint-Étienne	Total		0	0	0	0	0	0	—		—		0	0
Chaves (loan)	2017–18	Primeira Liga	20	1	1	0	0	0	—		—		21	1
CSKA Sofia (loan)	2018–19	Bulgarian First League	32	5	5	0	—		5	1	—		42	6
Ludogorets Razgrad	2019–20	Bulgarian First League	22	7	1	0	—		7 (Note: Two appearances in UEFA Champions League, five appearances in UEFA Europa League)	0	0	0	30	7
Ludogorets Razgrad	2020–21	Bulgarian First League	8	1	0	0	—		2 (Note: Appearances in UEFA Champions League)	0	1 (Note: Appearance in Bulgarian Supercup)	0	11	1
Ludogorets Razgrad	2021–22	Bulgarian First League	0	0	0	0	—		0	0	0	0	0	0
Ludogorets Razgrad	2022–23	Bulgarian First League	3	1	0	0	—		3 (Note: One appearance in UEFA Champions League, two appearances in UEFA Europa League)	0	0	0	6	1
Ludogorets Razgrad	Total		33	9	1	0	—		12	0	1	0	47	9
Wadi Degla (loan)	2020–21	Egyptian Premier League	24	0	1	1	—		—		—		25	1
Wisła Płock (loan)	2021–22	Ekstraklasa	22	1	1	0	—		—		—		23	1
Ludogorets Razgrad II	2022–23	Bulgarian Second League	9	0	—		—		—		—		9	0
Ordabasy	2023	Kazakhstan Premier League	13	0	5	0	—		1 (Note: Appearances in UEFA Europa Conference League)	0	0	0	19	0
Torpedo Kutaisi	2024	Erovnuli Liga	22	1	0	0	—		2	0	2 (Note: Appearances in Georgian Super Cup)	1	26	2
Omonia Aradippou	2024–25	Cypriot First Division	12	4	0	0	—		—		—		12	4
Career total			209	28	14	1	2	0	22	1	3	1	250	31

=== International ===
As of match played 24 March 2025

Appearances and goals by national team and year
National team	Year	Apps	Goals
Guinea-Bissau	2018	3	0
Guinea-Bissau	2019	5	1
Guinea-Bissau	2020	2	0
Guinea-Bissau	2021	8	1
Guinea-Bissau	2022	7	3
Guinea-Bissau	2023	2	0
Guinea-Bissau	2025	2	0
Total		29	5

Scores and results list Guinea-Bissau's goal tally first, score column indicates score after each Jorginho goal.

List of international goals scored by Jorginho
No.	Date	Venue	Opponent	Score	Result	Competition	Ref.
1	13 November 2019	Estádio 24 de Setembro, Bissau, Guinea-Bissau	Eswatini	1–0	3–0	2021 Africa Cup of Nations qualification	
2	30 March 2021	Estádio 24 de Setembro, Bissau, Guinea-Bissau	Congo	3–0	3–0	2021 Africa Cup of Nations qualification	
3	9 June 2022	Marrakesh Stadium, Marrakesh, Morocco	São Tomé and Príncipe	5–1	5–1	2023 Africa Cup of Nations qualification	
4	13 June 2022	Stade General Lansana Conté, Conakry, Guinea	Sierra Leone	1–0	2–2	2023 Africa Cup of Nations qualification	
5	13 June 2022	Stade General Lansana Conté, Conakry, Guinea	Sierra Leone	2–0	2–2	2023 Africa Cup of Nations qualification	

== Honours ==
Ludogorets Razgrad

- First Professional Football League (Bulgaria): 2019–20

Ordabasy

- Kazakhstan Premier League: 2023

Torpedo Kutaisi

- Georgian Super Cup: 2024
