= David Jablonský =

Czech footballer (born 1991)

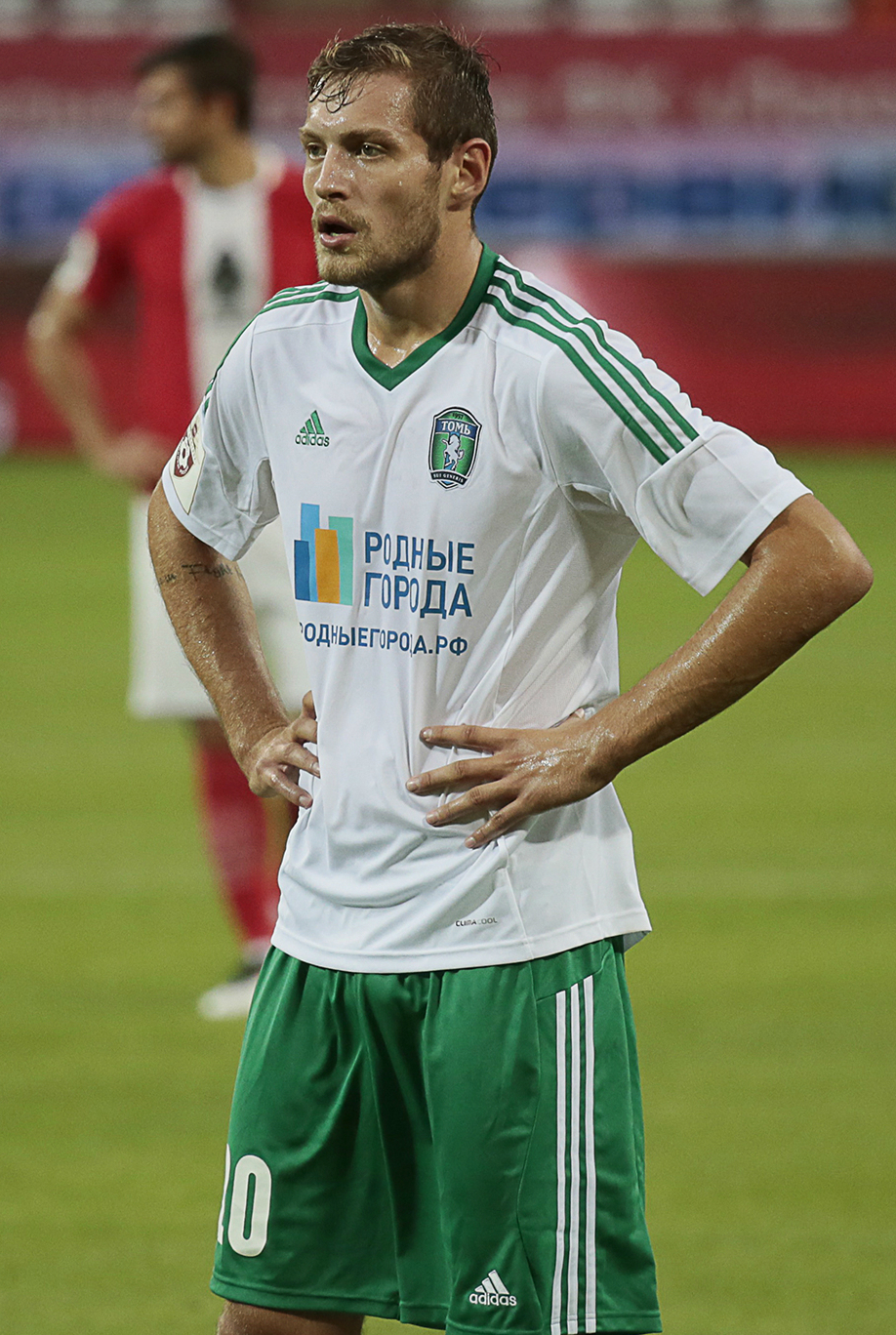
- Jablonský with Tom Tomsk in 2016

Personal information
- Full name: David Jablonský
- Date of birth: 8 October 1991 (age 35)
- Place of birth: Sokolov, Czechoslovakia
- Height: 1.90 m (6 ft 3 in)
- Position: Centre-back

Team information
- Current team: Baník Modlany
- Number: 60

Senior career*
Years	Team	Apps	(Gls)
2009–2016	FK Teplice	85	(7)
2010	→ Čáslav (loan)		
2011	→ Česká Lípa (loan)		
2011–2012	→ Ústí nad Labem (loan)	21	(1)
2016	→ Baník Sokolov (loan)	12	(1)
2016	Tom Tomsk	6	(0)
2017–2019	Levski Sofia	64	(12)
2019–2024	Cracovia	52	(3)
2019	Cracovia II	3	(1)
2025–	Baník Modlany	0	(0)
- * Club domestic league appearances and goals as of 4 June 2024

David Jablonský (born 8 October 1991) is a Czech professional footballer who plays as a centre-back for Czech regional championship club Baník Modlany.

== Career ==
On 9 January 2017, Jablonský signed a two-and-a-half-year contract with Bulgarian club Levski Sofia. On 4 March, he scored his first goal in the Bulgarian league, the winner in the Bulgarian eternal derby against CSKA Sofia, which finished 2–1. Jablonský went on to establish himself as a vital part of the team, being responsible for ten clean sheets in the first half of the 2017–18 season, while also being the top scorer of Levski with nine goals. He managed to get himself on the scoresheet in another Eternal derby, netting the first goal in a 2–2 draw.

In September 2020, he was banned by FIFA from any football activities for 18 months for match-fixing while playing for FK Teplice in 2012. He returned to training in early 2022.

In March 2025, Jablonský joined Czech regional championship club Baník Modlany.

== Honours ==
Cracovia

- Polish Cup: 2019–20

Cracovia II

- IV liga Lesser Poland West: 2019–20

Individual

- Bulgarian First League Best Defender: 2017
