= Georgi Stoichkov =

Bulgarian footballer

Personal information
- Full name: Georgi Ivov Stoichkov
- Date of birth: 27 May 1994 (age 32)
- Place of birth: Sofia, Bulgaria
- Height: 1.85 m (6 ft 1 in)
- Position: Midfielder

Team information
- Current team: Balkan Botevgrad
- Number: 22

Youth career
- Levski Sofia

Senior career*
Years	Team	Apps	(Gls)
2012–2013	Levski Sofia	0	(0)
2014	Vitosha Bistritsa	12	(0)
2014	Botev Vratsa	13	(1)
2015	Lokomotiv Mezdra	21	(2)
2016	Pirin Razlog	8	(1)
2016–2019	Septemvri Sofia	71	(2)
2020	Hebar	3	(0)
2020–	Balkan Botevgrad	1	(0)
- * Club domestic league appearances and goals as of 26 October 2021 (UTC)

Georgi Stoichkov (Bulgarian: Георги Стоичков; born 27 May 1994) is a Bulgarian footballer who plays as a midfielder for Bulgarian Third League club Balkan Botevgrad.
