= Anthony Belmonte =

French football player

Personal information
- Date of birth: 16 October 1995 (age 31)
- Place of birth: Istres, France
- Height: 1.85 m (6 ft 1 in)
- Position: Midfielder

Team information
- Current team: BG Pathum United
- Number: 26

Senior career*
Years	Team	Apps	(Gls)
2013–2015	Istres	13	(0)
2015–2017	Dijon B	12	(0)
2015–2017	Dijon	22	(0)
2017–2019	Levski Sofia	27	(1)
2019–2022	Grenoble	42	(3)
2022–2024	Levadiakos	42	(2)
2024–2025	Iraklis	15	(1)
2025–2026	Panionios	20	(2)
2026–	BG Pathum United	0	(0)
- * Club domestic league appearances and goals as of 20 April 2026

Anthony Belmonte (born 16 October 1995) is a French professional footballer who plays as a Midfielder for Thai League 1 club BG Pathum United.

== Career ==
On 1 September 2017, Belmonte signed a three-year contract with Bulgarian club Levski Sofia.

In July 2019, Belmonte joined Grenoble Foot.
