= Lansana Conté Stadium =

Stadium in Conakry, Guinea

Coordinates: 9°37′27″N 13°37′36″W

General Lansana Conté Stadium
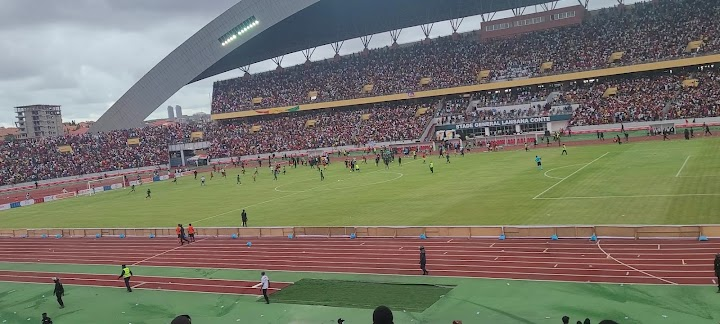
- Interior view of the stadium
- Full name: Stade Général Lansana Conté
- Location: Conakry, Guinea
- Owner: Guinean Football Federation
- Capacity: 50,000
- Surface: GrassMaster

Construction
- Built: 2007
- Opened: 2011
- Renovated: 2024–2025
- Cost: $50 million
- Architect: Shanghai Construction

Tenant
- Guinea national football team

General Lansana Conté Stadium is a new multi-use stadium in Conakry, Guinea. It was completed in 2011, it is used mostly for football and athletics competitions and it hosts some home matches for the Guinea national football team. It has a capacity of 50,000.
