= Evandro (footballer, born 1997) =

Brazilian footballer

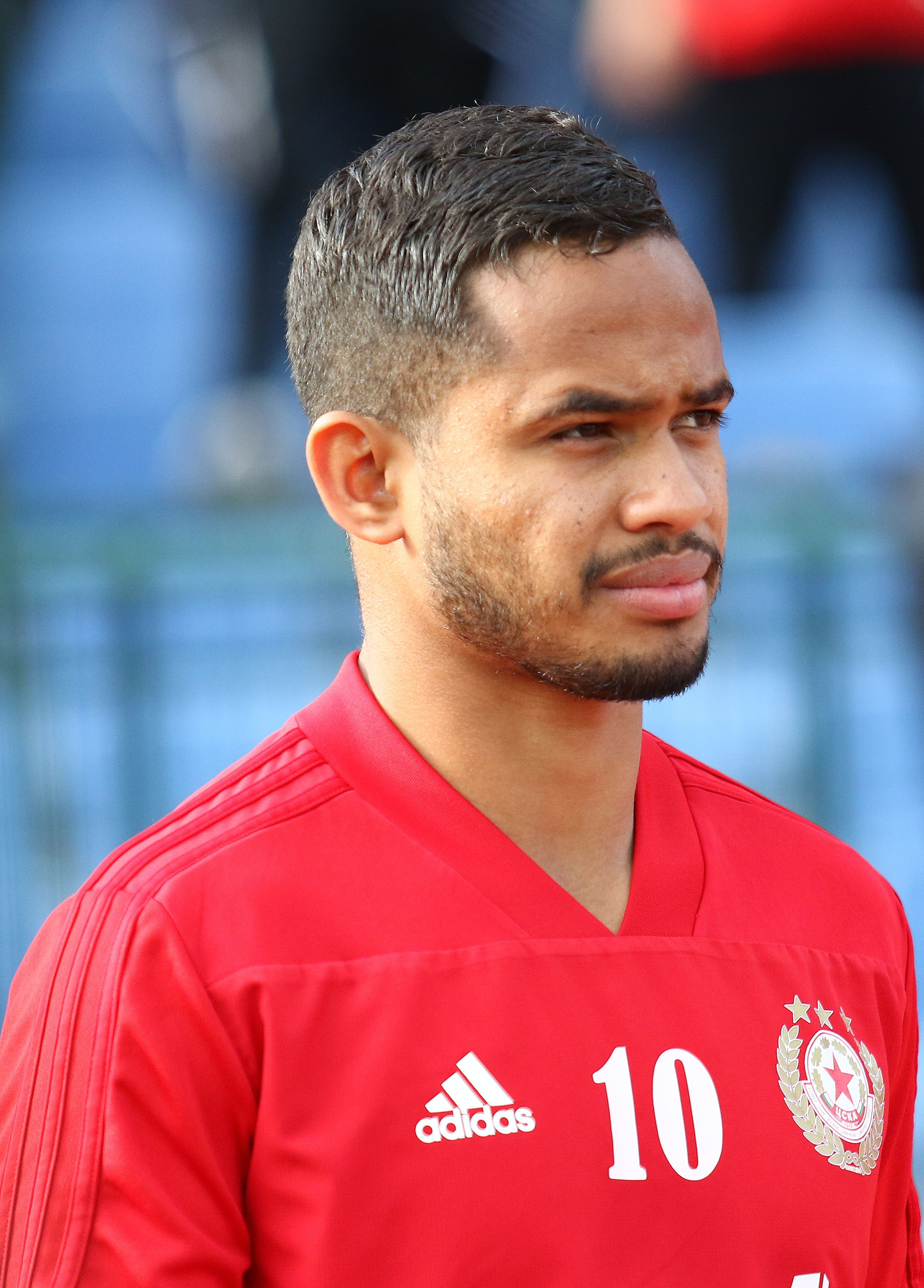

Personal information
- Full name: Evandro da Silva
- Date of birth: 14 January 1997 (age 29)
- Place of birth: Messias, Brazil
- Height: 1.73 m (5 ft 8 in)
- Positions: Winger; forward

Team information
- Current team: Radnički Kragujevac
- Number: 9

Youth career
- Coritiba

Senior career*
| Years | Team | Apps | (Gls) |
| 2015–2018 | Coritiba | 27 | (4) |
| 2017–2018 | → Red Bull Brasil (loan) | 8 | (1) |
| 2018–2020 | CSKA Sofia | 50 | (12) |
| 2020–2022 | Fehérvár | 8 | (1) |
| 2021 | → Proleter Novi Sad (loan) | 12 | (2) |
| 2022–2023 | Radnički Kragujevac | 21 | (1) |
| 2023 | ABC | 12 | (0) |
| 2024 | Náutico | 13 | (2) |
| 2024– | Radnički 1923 | 36 | (7) |
| 2025 | → Jeju SK (loan) | 5 | (0) |

International career^{‡}
| 2016 | Brazil U20 | 5 | (3) |
- * Club domestic league appearances and goals as of 5 June 2026 ‡ National team caps and goals as of 5 December 2021

Evandro da Silva (born 14 January 1997), simply known as Evandro, is a Brazilian professional footballer who plays as a winger for Serbian SuperLiga club Radnički 1923.

== Career ==
=== Coritiba ===
Evandro began his career at Coritiba. He made his competitive debut for the club against Corinthians on 26 July 2015, where he came on as a 46th-minute substitute for Leandro Silva and scored a goal in the 2nd minute of stoppage time for a 1–1 home draw.

=== CSKA Sofia ===
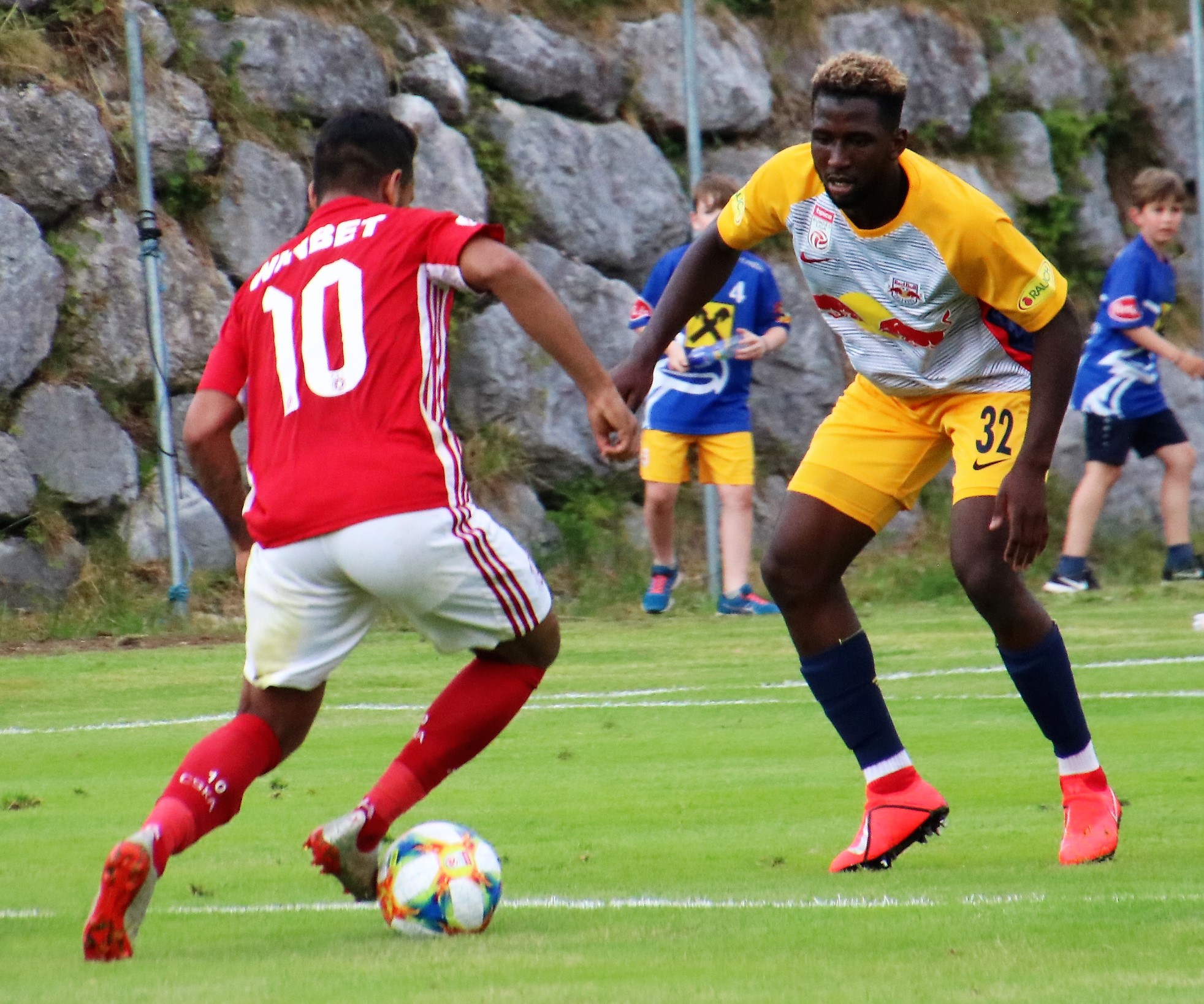
Evandro in action for CSKA Sofia in 2019 against Red Bull Salzburg

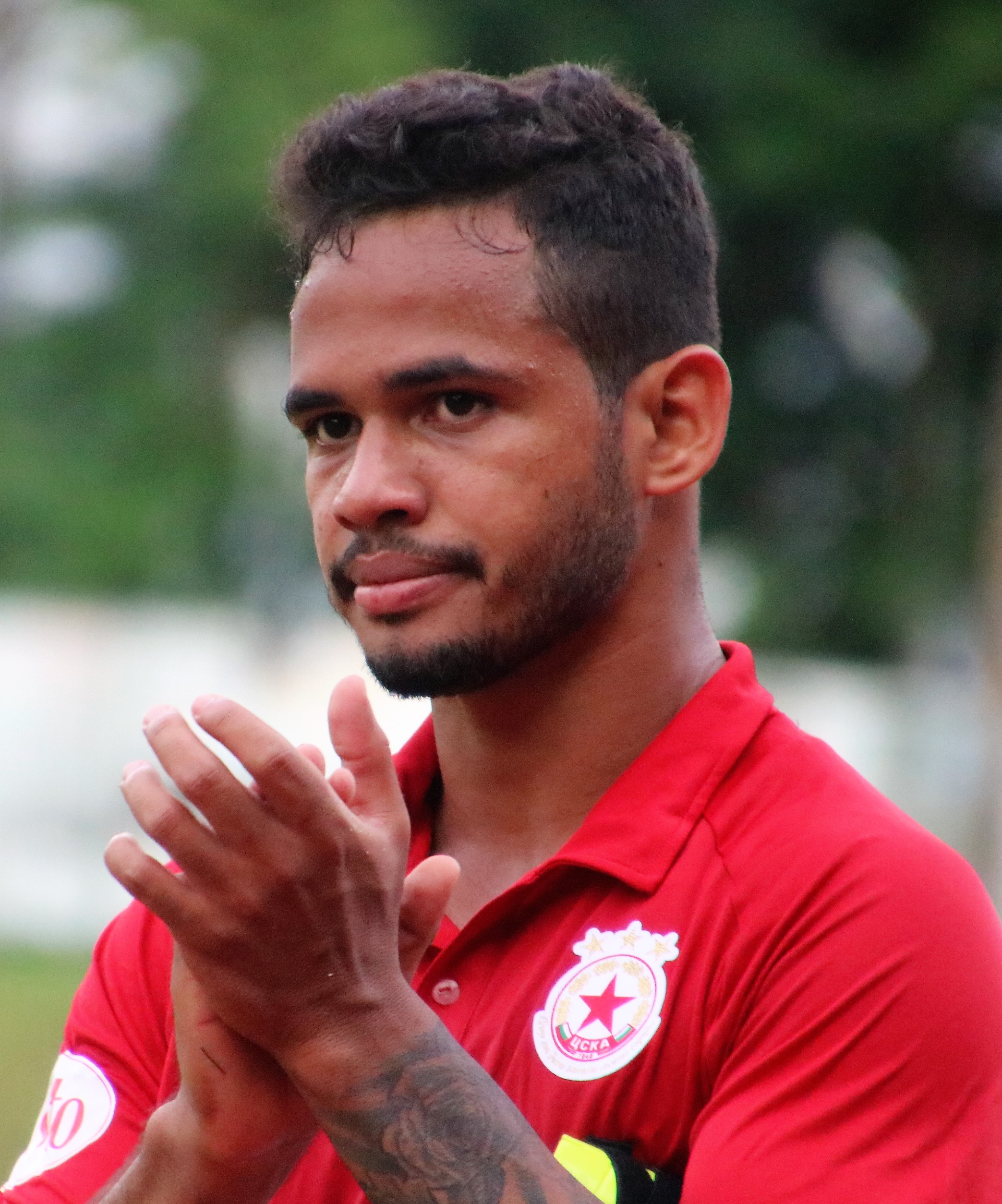

Evandro signed with Bulgarian club CSKA Sofia in July 2018.

== Career statistics ==
As of 15 May 2022

| Club | Season | League | | Cup | | Continental | | Other (Note: Including Campeonato Paulista, Campeonato Paranaense and the Primeira Liga.) | | Total | |
| Club | Season | Apps | Goals | Apps | Goals | Apps | Goals | Apps | Goals | Apps | Goals |
|---|---|---|---|---|---|---|---|---|---|---|---|
| Coritiba | 2015 | 10 | 3 | 3 | 1 | 0 | 0 | 0 | 0 | 13 | 4 |
| Coritiba | 2016 | 11 | 0 | 0 | 0 | 2 | 1 | 6 | 1 | 19 | 2 |
| Red Bull Brasil (loan) | 2017 | 3 | 0 | 0 | 0 | – | | 5 | 1 | 8 | 1 |
| Coritiba | 2018 | 0 | 0 | 1 | 0 | 0 | 0 | 7 | 1 | 8 | 1 |
| Coritiba | Total | 21 | 3 | 4 | 1 | 2 | 1 | 13 | 2 | 40 | 7 |
| CSKA Sofia | 2018–19 | 20 | 2 | 4 | 2 | 1 | 1 | – | | 25 | 5 |
| CSKA Sofia | 2019–20 | 30 | 10 | 5 | 0 | 5 | 3 | – | | 40 | 13 |
| CSKA Sofia | Total | 50 | 12 | 9 | 2 | 6 | 4 | 0 | 0 | 65 | 18 |
| Fehérvár | 2020–21 | 7 | 1 | 2 | 2 | 3 | 0 | – | | 12 | 3 |
| Fehérvár | 2021–22 | 1 | 0 | 1 | 0 | 0 | 0 | – | | 2 | 0 |
| Fehérvár | Total | 8 | 1 | 3 | 2 | 3 | 0 | 0 | 0 | 14 | 3 |
| Career total | | 82 | 16 | 16 | 5 | 11 | 5 | 18 | 3 | 127 | 29 |
