= Louis Nganioni =

French footballer (born 1995)

Personal information
- Date of birth: 3 June 1995 (age 31)
- Place of birth: Melun, France
- Height: 1.78 m (5 ft 10 in)
- Position: Left back

Team information
- Current team: Pontarlier

Youth career
- 2002–2003: Melon
- 2003–2008: Le Mée
- 2008–2010: CS Brétigny
- 2010–2013: Lyon

Senior career*
Years	Team	Apps	(Gls)
2013–2015	Lyon B	52	(1)
2015–2018	Lyon	0	(0)
2015–2016	→ FC Utrecht (loan)	11	(0)
2016–2017	→ Brest (loan)	20	(1)
2018–2019	Levski Sofia	7	(0)
2019–2020	Fremad Amager	3	(0)
2021–2022	Tsarsko Selo	26	(0)
2022–2023	Sète	20	(1)
2024–	Pontarlier	5	(0)

International career
2010–2011	France U16	13	(0)
2011–2012	France U17	9	(0)
2012–2013	France U18	5	(0)
2013	France U19	5	(0)
2014–2015	France U20	7	(0)
- * Club domestic league appearances and goals as of 7 December 2024

Louis Nganioni (born 3 June 1995) is a French professional footballer who plays as a defender for Championnat National 3 club Pontarlier.

== Career ==
=== Lyon ===
Nganioni began his career with various local youth clubs before joining Lyon as a youth player in July 2010 and made his professional football debut with Lyon B in 2013. In three years with the reserve side he appeared in 52 matches scoring one goal.

Following his return to Lyon at the beginning of the 2017–2018, Nganioni did not make an appearance for Lyon's first team. At the end of the season, on 30 May, he went on trial with New York Red Bulls. Following his release by Lyon on 1 July, he trialled with Scottish side Dundee F.C. and Austrian Bundesliga club Austria Wien.

==== Utrecht (loan) ====
On 9 July 2015, Nganioni was sent on loan to Eredivisie club FC Utrecht. On 8 August 2015 he made his debut for the club in a 3–2 loss to Feyenoord. In his one season with the Dutch side he made 12 appearances.

==== Brest (loan) ====
After returning to Lyon, Nganioni was loaned to Ligue 2 side Brest for the 2016–17 campaign. On 26 September 2016 Nganioni made his debut with Brest, appearing as a starter in a 2–1 victory over Stade de Reims. He scored his first goal for the club on 17 March 2017, opening the scoring in a 3–0 victory over Stade Lavallois.

=== Levski Sofia ===
On 31 August 2018, Nganioni signed a two-year deal with Bulgarian club Levski Sofia.

=== Fremad Amager ===
On 5 September 2019 Danish 1st Division club Fremad Amager announced, that Nganioni had joined the club. The deal was terminated by mutual agreement on 22 July 2020.

== Personal life ==
Nganioni is of Congolese descent.
