= Czech regional championships =

- Country: Czech Republic
- Confederation: UEFA
- Number of clubs: 200 (in 13 groups) + 16 (Prague Championship, 1 group)
- Level on pyramid: 5
- Promotion to: Czech Fourth Divisions
- Relegation to: I.A classes (level 6)
- Domestic cup: Czech Cup
- Website: fotbal.cz

Czech regional championships (Czech: krajské přebory, singular: krajský přebor) are the 5th-tier football competitions in the Czech Republic outside of Prague, where the 5th tier league is called Prague Championship. There are 13 groups, each played within individual reagion. There are 16 teams in most groups, only in the 3 smallest regions 14 teams play.

The best teams from each region are promoted to the fourth divisions (divize), the lowest-placed teams are relegated to I.A classes (I.A třídy).

Czech football regional championships (including Prague Championship)
Region	Number of teams (2025–26)	Official website
Prague	16	
Central Bohemian	16	
South Bohemian	16	
Plzeň	16	
Karlovy Vary	14	
Ústí nad Labem	16	
Liberec	16	
Hradec Králové	16	
Pardubice	16	
Vysočina	14	
South Moravian	16	
Olomouc	16	
Zlín	14	
Moravian-Silesian	16	
