= Goderdzi Machaidze =

Georgian footballer

Personal information
- Date of birth: 17 July 1992 (age 34)
- Place of birth: Tbilisi, Georgia
- Height: 1.82 m (5 ft 11 1/2 in)
- Position: Right back

Team information
- Current team: Torpedo Kutaisi
- Number: 12

Senior career*
Years	Team	Apps	(Gls)
2011–2012	Merani Tbilisi	16	(1)
2012–2013	Guria Lanchkhuti	21	(3)
2013–2014	Sasco Tbilisi	17	(0)
2014	Gagra	17	(2)
2015–2016	Zugdidi	28	(0)
2017–2018	Dila Gori	31	(0)
2018–2019	Vereya	15	(0)
2019	Dila Gori	1	(0)
2019–	Torpedo Kutaisi	9	(0)
- * Club domestic league appearances and goals as of 22:36, 21 November 2019 (UTC)

Goderdzi Machaidze (Georgian: გოდერძი მაჩაიძე, romanized: goderdzi machaidze; born 17 July 1992) is a Georgian footballer who plays as a defender for FC Torpedo Kutaisi.
