= Janio Bikel =

Bissau-Guinean footballer

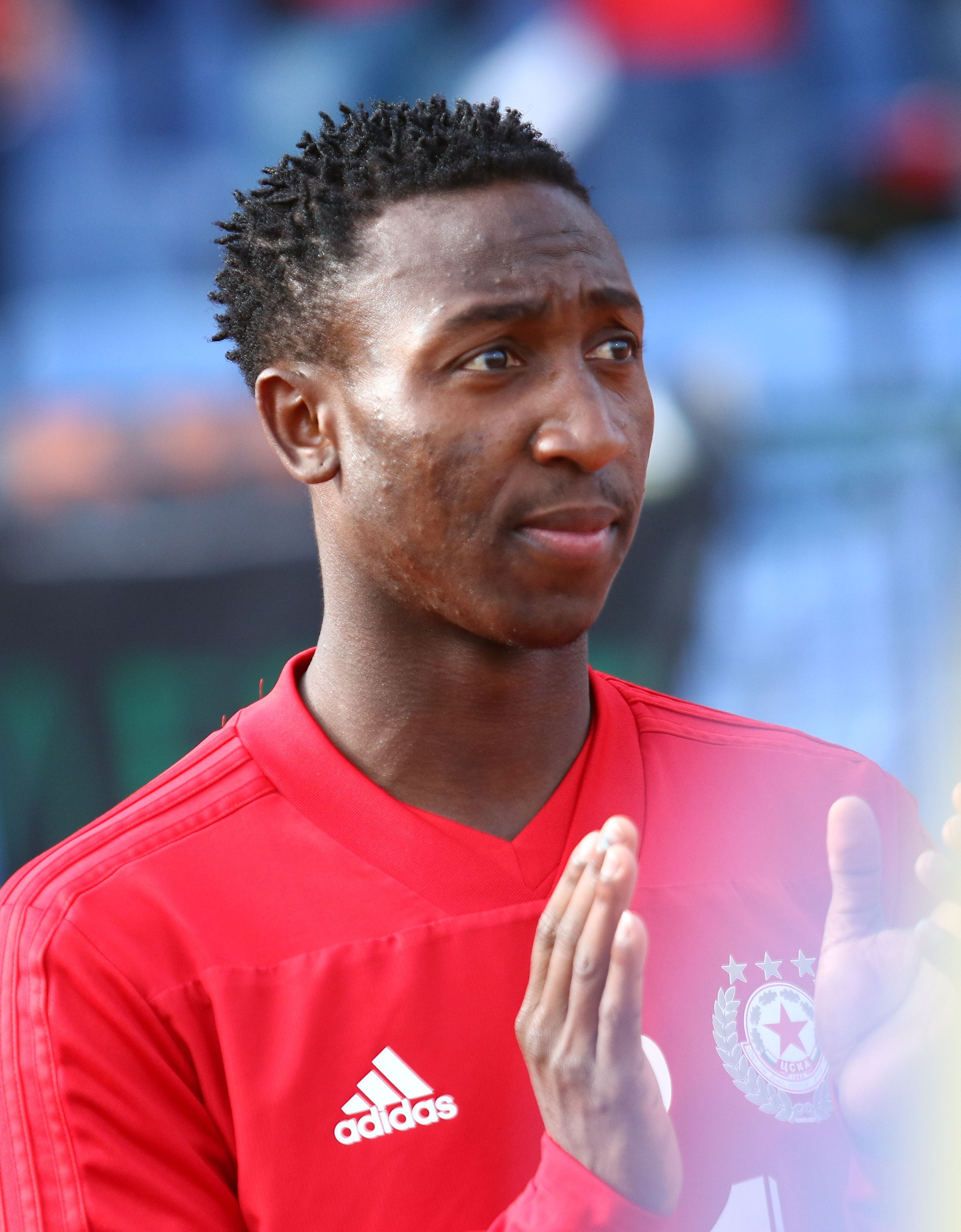

Personal information
- Full name: Janio Bikel Figueiredo da Silva
- Date of birth: 28 June 1995 (age 31)
- Place of birth: Bissau, Guinea-Bissau
- Height: 1.75 m (5 ft 9 in)
- Position: Defensive midfielder

Team information
- Current team: Maccabi Netanya

Youth career
- –2012: Torre Levante
- 2012–2015: SC Heerenveen

Senior career*
Years	Team	Apps	(Gls)
2015	SC Heerenveen	6	(0)
2015–2018	NEC	67	(2)
2018–2020	CSKA Sofia	61	(0)
2020–2022	Vancouver Whitecaps FC	45	(1)
2022	→ Vicenza (loan)	17	(0)
2023	FC Khimki	11	(0)
2023–2024	Gaziantep	16	(0)
2024–	Maccabi Netanya	18	(0)

International career^{‡}
2013	Portugal U19	3	(0)
2015	Portugal U20	5	(0)
2022–	Guinea-Bissau	19	(0)
- * Club domestic league appearances and goals as of 26 June 2024 ‡ National team caps and goals as of 26 June 2024

Janio Bikel Figueiredo da Silva (born 28 June 1995), known as Janio Bikel, is a Bissau-Guinean professional footballer who plays as a defensive midfielder for Israeli club Maccabi Netanya. He formerly played for SC Heerenveen, NEC, CSKA Sofia, Vancouver Whitecaps FC and Gaziantep. A former youth international for Portugal, he plays for the Guinea-Bissau national team.

== Club career ==
On 7 March 2015, Janio Bikel made his professional debut with SC Heerenveen in a 2014–15 Eredivisie match against ADO Den Haag.

On 14 June 2018, Janio Bikel signed with Bulgarian club CSKA Sofia.

Janio Bikel moved to Canadian Major League Soccer side Vancouver Whitecaps FC on 28 February 2020. He scored his first goal on 23 June 2021, in a 2–1 loss to the LA Galaxy

On 21 January 2022, Janio Bikel joined Italian club Vicenza on loan.

Bikel didn't appear for Vancouver during their 2022 season, but was officially released by the club at the end of the season.

On 11 February 2023, Bikel signed with Russian Premier League club FC Khimki. Bikel left Khimki following their relegation in June 2023.

On August 15, 2023, he signed a two-year contract with Turkish Süper Lig club Gaziantep.

On 13 August 2024, signed for the Israeli Premier League club Maccabi Netanya.

== International career ==
Born in Guinea-Bissau and raised in Portugal, Bikel is a former youth international for Portugal. He debuted with the Guinea-Bissau national team in a friendly 3–0 win over Equatorial Guinea on 23 March 2022.

== Career statistics ==
=== Club ===
As of match played 8 March 2025

Appearances and goals by club, season and competition
Club	Season	League			National cup (Note: Includes KNVB Cup, Bulgarian Cup, Canadian Championship, Coppa Italia, Russian Cup, Turkish Cup and Israel State Cup)		Continental		Other		Total	
Club	Season	Division	Apps	Goals	Apps	Goals	Apps	Goals	Apps	Goals	Apps	Goals
Heerenveen	2014-15	Eredivisie	6	0	0	0	—		—		6	0
NEC	2015-16	Eredivisie	32	2	2	0	—		—		34	2
NEC	2016-17	Eredivisie	30	0	1	0	—		1 (Note: Appearance(s) in Eredivisie Promotion/Relegation play-offs)	0	32	0
NEC	2017-18	Eerste Divisie	5	0	1	0	—		1	0	7	0
NEC	Total		67	2	4	0	—		2	0	73	2
CSKA Sofia	2018-19	Bulgarian First League	30	0	5	0	5 (Note: Appearance(s) in UEFA Europa League)	0	—		40	0
CSKA Sofia	2019-20	Bulgarian First League	14	0	1	0	6	0	—		21	0
CSKA Sofia	Total		44	0	6	0	11	0	—		61	0
Vancouver Whitecaps	2020	MLS	12	0	—		—		0	0	12	0
Vancouver Whitecaps	2021	MLS	33	1	1	0	—		0	0	34	1
Vancouver Whitecaps	2022	MLS	0	0	0	0	—		—		0	0
Vancouver Whitecaps	Total		45	1	1	0	—		0	0	46	1
Vicenza (loan)	2021-22	Serie B	17	0	0	0	—		2 (Note: Appearance(s) in Serie B Relegation play-offs)	0	19	0
Khimki	2022-23	Russian Premier League	11	0	0	0	—		—		11	0
Gaziantep	2023-24	Süper Lig	16	0	3	0	—		—		19	0
Maccabi Netanya	2024-25	Israeli Premier League	12	0	0	0	—		1 (Note: Appearance(s) in Toto Cup)	0	13	0
Career total			218	3	14	0	11	0	5	0	248	3

=== International ===
As of match played 20 March 2025

Appearances and goals by national team and year
National team	Year	Apps	Goals
Guinea-Bissau	2022	4	0
Guinea-Bissau	2023	5	0
Guinea-Bissau	2024	12	0
Guinea-Bissau	2025	1	0
Total		22	0
