= Erol Erdal Alkan =

Turkish footballer (born 1994)

Personal information
- Date of birth: 16 February 1994 (age 32)
- Place of birth: Amsterdam, Netherlands
- Height: 1.93 m (6 ft 4 in)
- Position: Centre-back

Team information
- Current team: Esperanza Pelt

Youth career
- 1999–2004: Amsterdam Gençler Birliği
- 2004–2007: Zeeburgia
- 2007–2009: Ajax
- 2009–2012: SC Heerenveen
- 2012–2013: İstanbul BB
- 2013–2014: Elazığspor

Senior career*
Years	Team	Apps	(Gls)
2014	Elazığspor	6	(0)
2014	Kocaeli Birlik Spor	1	(0)
2015–2016	Hatayspor	17	(0)
2016–2018	Dordrecht	47	(2)
2018–2020	Beroe	36	(0)
2020–2021	Türkgücü München	4	(0)
2021	Etar	1	(0)
2021–2022	Uşakspor	5	(0)
2022	Finn Harps	7	(0)
2022–	Esperanza Pelt		

International career
2016	Turkey U21	3	(0)
- * Club domestic league appearances and goals as of 6 August 2022

Erol Erdal Alkan (born 16 February 1994) is a professional footballer who plays as a centre-back for Belgian club FC Esperanza Pelt. Born in the Netherlands, he has represented Turkey at youth international level

== Club career ==
Alkan made his Süper Lig debut on 26 January 2014.

On 7 July 2018, he signed with Bulgarian club Beroe. He established himself as a starter, but parted ways with the team by mutual consent in January 2020.

After leaving Beroe, Alkan earned a trial at Wycombe Wanderers and appeared against Hungerford Town in the Berks & Bucks Senior Cup, but was not offered a contract by the EFL League One club. On 1 July 2020, he signed with Türkgücü München, newly promoted to the German 3. Liga.

On 23 January 2022, it was announced that Alkan had signed for League of Ireland Premier Division club Finn Harps. After 7 appearances for the club, it was announced on 28 July 2022 that he was one of 4 players departing Finn Harps, with Alkan joining Belgian club FC Esperanza Pelt.

== International career ==
Alkan was born in the Netherlands to a Surinamese mother and Turkish father. He chose to represent Turkey at the international level and made his debut with the Turkey U21s against his birth country, the Netherlands.
