= Edwin Gyasi =

Dutch-born Ghanaian footballer (born 1991)

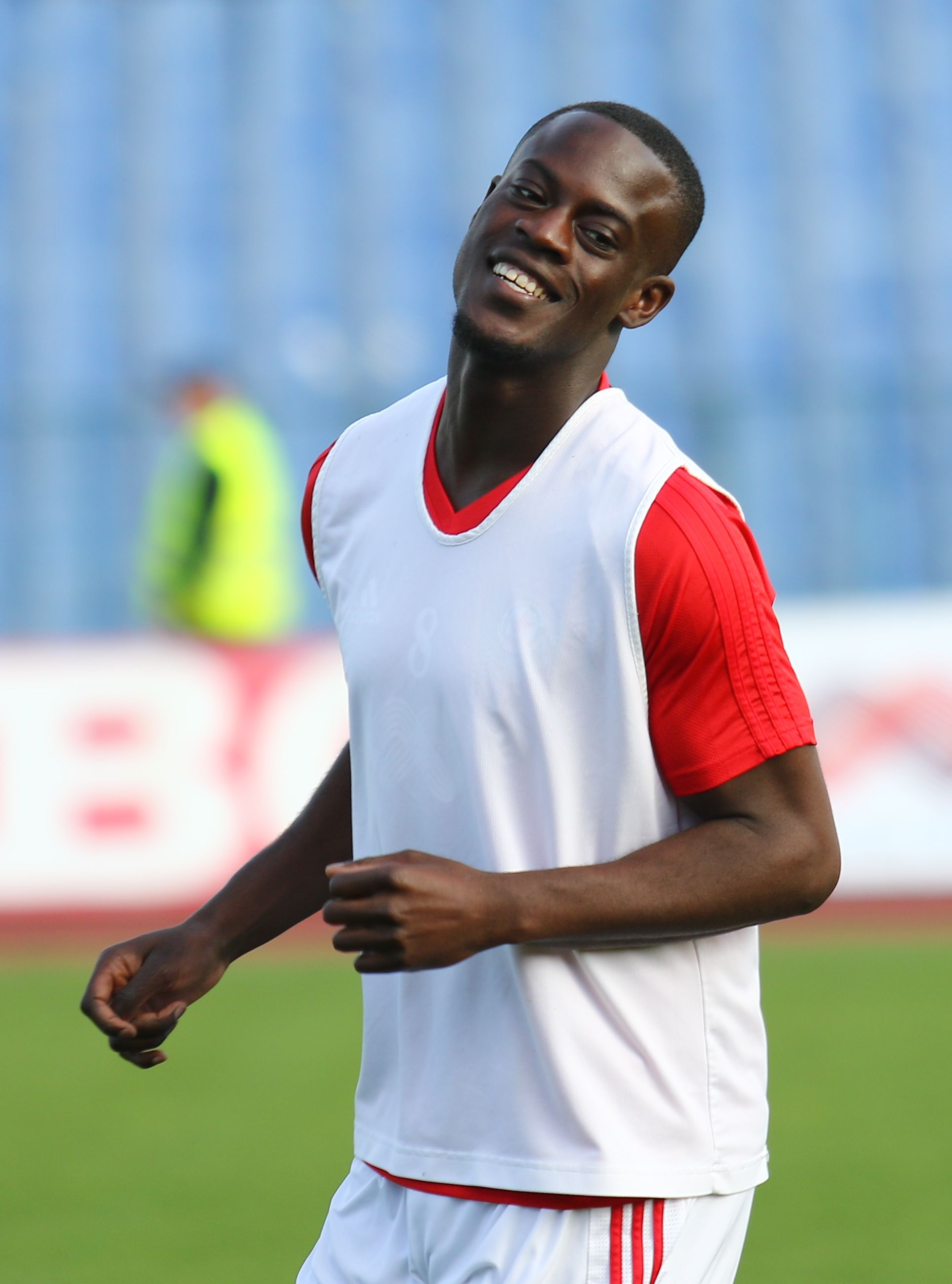
- Gyasi in training with CSKA Sofia in 2018

Personal information
- Full name: Edwin Oppong Anane-Gyasi
- Date of birth: 1 July 1991 (age 35)
- Place of birth: Amsterdam, Netherlands
- Height: 1.85 m (6 ft 1 in)
- Position: Winger

Team information
- Current team: Sevlievo
- Number: 11

Youth career
- CTO '70
- AFC
- AZ

Senior career*
Years	Team	Apps	(Gls)
2010–2012	AZ	0	(0)
2010–2011	→ Telstar (loan)	29	(3)
2012	De Graafschap	1	(0)
2012–2013	Twente	13	(1)
2013–2015	Heracles Almelo	5	(0)
2015–2016	Roda JC Kerkrade	30	(3)
2016–2017	Aalesund	53	(12)
2018–2020	CSKA Sofia	49	(6)
2019	→ FC Dallas (loan)	4	(0)
2020	Samsunspor	13	(1)
2021	Boluspor	11	(0)
2021–2022	Beitar Jerusalem	19	(0)
2022–2023	Kukësi	10	(0)
2023–2024	Aiolikos	4	(0)
2025	Gandzasar Kapan	7	(0)
2025–	Sevlievo	10	(1)

International career^{‡}
2017–2018	Ghana	5	(1)
- * Club domestic league appearances and goals as of 11 June 2026 ‡ National team caps and goals as of 16 September 2018

Edwin Gyasi (born 1 July 1991) is a professional footballer who plays as a winger for Bulgarian Second League club Sevlievo. Born in the Netherlands, he played for the Ghana national team at international level.

Gyasi formerly played for Aalesund, Telstar, De Graafschap, FC Twente and Heracles Almelo. He is a brother of fellow footballer Raymond Gyasi.

== International career ==
Born in the Netherlands to Ghanaian parents, Gyasi made his senior debut for the Ghana national football team in a 5-1 2018 FIFA World Cup qualification win over Congo on 5 September 2017.

== Career statistics ==
=== Club ===
As of match played on 13 November 2022

Appearances and goals by club, season and competition
Club	Season	League			Cup		Other (Note: Includes appearances in Promotion/relegation play-offs and UEFA Europa League.)		Total	
Club	Season	Division	Apps	Goals	Apps	Goals	Apps	Goals	Apps	Goals
Telstar (loan)	2010–11	Eerste Divisie	29	3	2	0	0	0	31	3
De Graafschap	2011–12	Eredivisie	1	0	0	0	0	0	1	0
FC Twente	2012–13	Eredivisie	13	1	2	0	1	0	16	1
Heracles Almelo	2013–14	Eredivisie	2	0	0	0	0	0	2	0
Heracles Almelo	2014–15	Eredivisie	3	0	0	0	0	0	3	0
Heracles Almelo	Total		5	0	0	0	0	0	5	0
Roda JC	2014–15	Eerste Divisie	12	2	2	1	3	0	17	3
Roda JC	2015–16	Eredivisie	18	1	3	0	0	0	21	1
Roda JC	Total		30	3	5	1	3	0	38	4
Aalesund	2016	Tippeligaen	26	6	0	0	0	0	26	6
Aalesund	2017	Eliteserien	27	6	1	0	0	0	28	6
Aalesund	Total		53	12	1	0	0	0	54	12
CSKA Sofia	2017–18	First League	10	1	2	0	0	0	12	1
CSKA Sofia	2018–19	First League	30	5	2	0	6	0	37	5
CSKA Sofia	2019–20	First League	9	0	2	1	0	0	10	1
CSKA Sofia	Total		49	6	6	1	6	0	61	7
FC Dallas (loan)	2019	MLS	4	0	0	0	0	0	4	0
Samsunspor	2020–21	TFF	13	1	1	0	0	0	14	1
Boluspor	2020–21	TFF	11	0	1	0	0	0	12	0
Beitar Jerusalem	2021–22	Israeli Premier League	19	0	2	0	5	0	26	0
FK Kukësi	2022–23	Kategoria Superiore	10	0	1	0	0	0	11	0
Career totals			237	26	20	1	16	0	273	27

=== International ===
Ghana national team
Year	Apps	Goals
2017	2	1
2018	3	0
Total	5	1

Statistics accurate as of match played 16 September 2018

=== International goals ===
Scores and results list Ghana's goal tally first.

No	Date	Venue	Opponent	Score	Result	Competition	Ref.
1.	12 November 2017	Baba Yara Stadium, Kumasi, Ghana	Egypt	1–1	1–1	2018 FIFA World Cup qualification	
