= Martin Petkov (footballer, born 2001) =

Bulgarian footballer

Personal information
- Full name: Martin Petkov Petkov
- Date of birth: 15 January 2001 (age 25)
- Place of birth: Chirpan, Bulgaria
- Height: 1.77 m (5 ft 9 1/2 in)
- Position: Winger

Youth career
- Levski Sofia

Senior career*
Years	Team	Apps	(Gls)
2018–2020	Levski Sofia	1	(0)
2019–2020	→ Lokomotiv GO (loan)	7	(1)
2020	→ Kariana Erden (loan)	0	(0)
2021	Etar Veliko Tarnovo	20	(6)
2022	Botev Vratsa	3	(0)
2022	Dunav Ruse	5	(1)
2022–2023	Minyor Pernik	10	(0)

International career^{‡}
2017–2018	Bulgaria U17	5	(3)
2019	Bulgaria U18	2	(1)
- * Club domestic league appearances and goals as of 15 February 2023 ‡ National team caps and goals as of 23 August 2021

Martin Petkov (Bulgarian: Мартин Петков; born 15 January 2001) is a Bulgarian footballer who plays as a winger.
