= Ivaylo Mihaylov (footballer, born 1991) =

Bulgarian footballer

Personal information
- Full name: Ivaylo Rumyanov Mihaylov
- Date of birth: 18 January 1991 (age 35)
- Place of birth: Pleven, Bulgaria
- Height: 1.78 m (5 ft 10 in)
- Position: Midfielder

Team information
- Current team: Yantra Gabrovo
- Number: 19

Youth career
- Belite orli

Senior career*
| Years | Team | Apps | (Gls) |
| 2009–2010 | Belite orli | 5 | (1) |
| 2010 | Akademik Svishtov | – | (–) |
| 2011 | Sparta Samovodene | – | (–) |
| 2011–2014 | Akademik Svishtov | – | (–) |
| 2014–2016 | Lokomotiv GO | 39 | (1) |
| 2016–2020 | Botev Vratsa | 112 | (3) |
| 2021–2022 | Sportist Svoge | 42 | (0) |
| 2022– | Yantra Gabrovo | 64 | (2) |
- * Club domestic league appearances and goals as of 15 June 2024

Ivaylo Mihaylov (Bulgarian: Ивайло Михайлов; born 18 January 1991) is a Bulgarian footballer who plays as a midfielder for Yantra Gabrovo.
