= Bošković =

Bošković (Serbian Cyrillic: Бошковић, pronounced [bôʃkoʋitɕ]) is a South Slavic surname, derived from the male given name Boško.

It may refer to:

- Anica Bošković, Ragusan writer
- Branko Bošković, Montenegrin football player
- Danko Bošković, Serbian German football player
- Darko Bošković, Serbian football player
- Goran Bošković, several people
- Ivan Bošković, Montenegrin football player
- Lea Bošković, Croatian tennis player
- Magda Bošković, Croatian communist, Partisan and member of the women's rights movement
- Maja Bošković-Stulli, Croatian historian, writer, publisher and academic
- Marko Bošković, Serbian football player
- Momčilo Bošković, Serbian football player
- Miho Bošković, Croatian water polo player
- Miroslav Bošković, Serbian football player
- Momčilo Bošković, Serbian football player
- Nemanja Bošković, Serbian football player
- Nikola Bošković, father of Ruđer Bošković
- Petar Bošković, Yugoslav and Serbian diplomat
- Predrag Bošković, Montenegrin politician
- Robert Boskovic Canadian soccer player
- Ruđer Bošković, Ragusan scientist
- Saša Bošković, Serbian handball coach
- Tanja Bošković, Serbian actress
- Tijana Bošković, Serbian volleyball player

== See also ==
- Boškovići, toponym
- Boškić
