= Boško =

Boško (Cyrillic script: Бошко) is a Slavic male given name. It may refer to:

- Boško Abramović (1951–2021), Serbian chess grandmaster
- Boško Anić (born 1968), retired Croatian footballer
- Boško Antić (1944–2007), Bosnian Serb footballer
- Boško Balaban (born 1978), Croatian footballer
- Boško Baškot (1921–2013), Yugoslav politician
- Boško Boškovič (born 1969), retired Slovenian football goalkeeper
- Boško Božinović (1949–2018), Croatian conditioning coach and a retired middle-distance runner
- Boško Buha (1926–1943), young Yugoslav Partisan and World War II icon
- Boško Bursać (1945–2020), former Bosnian Croat footballer
- Boško Ćirković "Škabo" (born 1976), Serbian rapper
- Boško Čvorkov (born 1978), Serbian footballer
- Boško Đokić (1953–2019), Serbian professional basketball coach and journalist
- Boško Dopuđ (born 1990), Serbian football defender
- Boško Đorđević (born 1953), retired Serbian footballer
- Boško Drašković (born 1987), Montenegrin boxer
- Boško Gjurovski (born 1961), Macedonian footballer
- Boško Janković (born 1983), Serbian footballer
- Foto Boško (1944–1993), Yugoslavian Craftsman Photographer known for his work and contributions to the local community.
- Boško Jovović (born 1983), Serbian professional basketball player
- Boško Kajganić (1949–1977), former Yugoslav footballer
- Boško Krunić (1929–2017), Yugoslavian Communist political figure
- Boško Lozica (born 1952), former water polo player
- Boško Marinko (1939–2020), Serbian former wrestler
- Boško Mihajlović (born 1971), Serbian former footballer
- Boško Minić (born 1966), former Serbian footballer
- Boško Obradović (born 1976), Serbian politician
- Boško Palkovljević Pinki (1920–1942), prominent Yugoslav Partisan fighter in World War II and People's Hero
- Boško Perošević (1956–2000), Serbian politician, former Chairman of Executive Council of Vojvodina
- Boško Petrović (footballer) (born 1975), former Serbian football player
- Boško Prodanović (1943–2024), retired Serbian professional footballer
- Boško Radonjić, known as "The Yugo" (1943–2011), Serbian nationalist and Irish American mob leader
- Boško Radulović (born 1996), Montenegrin swimmer
- Boško Ralić (1904–1978), Serbian footballer and coach
- Boško Simonović (1898–1965), Yugoslav
- Boško Stupić (born 1984), Bosnian footballer
- Boško Todorović (1905–1942), Chetnik commander
- Boško Virjanac (died 1915), Serbian Chetnik commander
- Boško Virčanac, Serbian Chetnik commander
- Boško Vuksanović (1928–2011), Yugoslav water polo player who competed in the 1952 Summer Olympics
- Božo Janković "Boško" (1951–1993), Bosnian and Yugoslav football player
- Romeo and Juliet in Sarajevo, a 1994 documentary about the deaths of Sarajevan lovers Admira Ismić and Boško Brkić

== See also ==
- Boško Buha Theatre, in Belgrade, Serbia
- Bošković, surname
- Boškovići (disambiguation), toponym
- Bosko (disambiguation)
