= Ruđer Bošković (disambiguation) =

Ruđer Bošković was an 18th-century scientist.

Boscovich may also refer to:

- Boscovich (crater) on the Moon
- Bošković (surname), a South Slavic surname

Ruđer Bošković may also refer to:

- Ruđer Bošković Institute
- Astronomical Society Ruđer Bošković
