= Bosco =

Bosco may refer to:

== People ==
=== Given name Bosco ===
- Bosco (drag queen), performing name of Blair Constantino, a drag performer from Seattle and contestant on season 14 of RuPaul's Drag Race
- Bosco, one half of the Indian choreographer duo Bosco–Caesar
- Bosco Lin Chi-nan (born 1943), Taiwanese bishop
- Bosco Frontán (born 1984), Uruguayan soccer player
- Bosco Hogan (born 1949), Irish actor
- Bosco Lowe (born 1943), American car race driver
- Bosco Mann (born 1974), American record producer
- Bosco McDermott (born 1936), Irish former sportsperson
- Bosco Ntaganda (born 1973), Congolese warlord
- Bosco Pérez-Pla (born 1987), Spanish field hockey player
- Bosco Puthur (born 1946), Syro-Malabar Catholic bishop
- Bosco Saraiva (born 1959), Brazilian politician
- Bosco da Silva (1937–2013), Hong Kong field hockey player
- Bosco Sodi (born 1970), Mexican artist
- Bosco Tjan (1966-2016), Chinese-American psychologist and neuroscientist
- Bosco Wong (born 1980), Hong Kong actor

=== Middle name Bosco ===
- Jean Bosco Mwenda (1930–1990), Congolese guitarist
- João Bosco de Freitas Chaves (born 1964), Brazilian footballer
- John Bosco Manat Chuabsamai (1935-2011), Thai priest
- Juan Bosco Maino Canales (disappeared 1976), Chilean political activist

=== Surname Bosco ===
- Douglas Bosco (born 1946), American politician from California
- Ferdinando Beneventano del Bosco (1813–1881), Brigadier General of the Army of the Two Sicilies
- Giacinto Bosco (1905–1997), Italian jurist, academic and politician
- Giovanni Bartolomeo Bosco (1793–1863), Italian magician
- Henri Bosco (1888–1976), French writer
- João Bosco (born 1946), Brazilian musician
- John Bosco (1815–1888), a.k.a. Don Bosco, Italian priest and founder of the Salesian Society
- Philip Bosco (1930–2018), American actor
- Robbie Bosco, American football quarterback for Brigham Young University
- Sacro Bosco (c. 1195-c. 1256), English monk and astronomer
- Yuri Bosco (1930–2019), Russian sculptor
- Brittany Bosco, American R&B singer

== Places ==
=== Italy ===
- Bosco (Albanella), a civil parish of the municipality of Albanella (SA), Campania
- Bosco (Rovito), a civil parish of the municipality of Rovito (CS), Calabria
- Bosco (San Giovanni a Piro), a civil parish of the municipality of San Giovanni a Piro (SA), Campania
- Bosco, part of the municipality of Corniglio in the Province of Parma, Emilia
- Bosco Chiesanuova, a municipality of the Province of Verona, Veneto
- Bosco Marengo, a municipality of the Province of Alessandria, Piedmont
- Boscoreale, a municipality of the Province of Naples, Campania
- Boscotrecase, a municipality of the Province of Naples, Campania
- Castelnuovo Don Bosco, a municipality of the Province of Asti, Piedmont
- San Giorgio in Bosco, a municipality of the Province of Padua, Veneto
- Sommariva del Bosco, a municipality of the Province of Cuneo, Piedmont

=== Switzerland ===
- Bosco/Gurin, a municipality of the Canton Ticino

=== United States ===
- Bosco, Kentucky
- Bosco, Louisiana

== Arts, entertainment, and media ==
- Sgt. Bosco "B.A." Baracus, a The A-Team character
- Maurice 'Bosco' Boscorelli, a Third Watch character
- Agent Sam Bosco, a The Mentalist character
- Sergeant Bosco, a Bob's Burgers character
- Bosco (film), 2024 film
- Bosco (TV series), a 1970s-1980s Irish programme
- Bosco Adventure, an anime television series

== Other uses ==
- Bosco (grape)
- Bosco Chocolate Syrup
- Bosco the dog, a dog elected honorary mayor of Sunol, California
- BOSCO-Uganda, a non-profit internet connectivity organization

== See also ==
- Bosko (disambiguation)
- Don Bosco School (disambiguation)
