= 1755 in science =

The year 1755 in science and technology involved some significant events.

== Astronomy ==
- Immanuel Kant develops the nebular hypothesis in his Universal Natural History and Theory of Heaven (Allgemeine Naturgeschichte und Theorie des Himmels).

== Chemistry ==
- June – Joseph Black's discovery of carbon dioxide ("fixed air") and magnesium is communicated in a paper to the Philosophical Society of Edinburgh.

== Earth sciences ==
- November 1 – An earthquake in Lisbon kills 30,000 inhabitants.
- Publication of De Litteraria expeditione per pontificiam ditionem ad dimetiendos duos meridiani gradus a PP, a description of the measurement of a meridian arc carried out in the Papal States by Ruđer Bošković with Christopher Maire in 1750–52.

== Life sciences ==
- August Johann Rösel von Rosenhof publishes the first record of an amoeba; he names it "der kleine Proteus" ("the little Proteus").

== Mathematics ==
- Leonhard Euler's Institutiones calculi differentialis is published.

== Technology ==
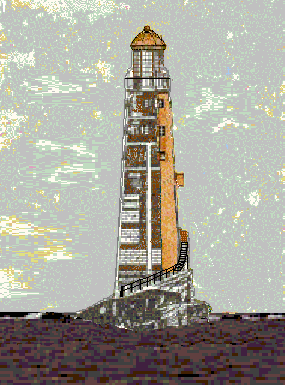
December 2: Fire burns second Eddystone Lighthouse, Rudyerd's wooden cone of 1709.

- December 2 – The second Eddystone Lighthouse (1709–1755), with a wooden cone, catches fire and burns to the ground; it will be rebuilt in stone.
- While serving as Postmaster General of the northern American colonies, Benjamin Franklin invents a simple odometer, attached to his horse carriage, to help analyze the best routes for delivering the mail.
- approx. date – Thomas Mudge invents the lever escapement for timepieces.

== Awards ==
- Copley Medal: John Huxham

== Births ==
- January 28 – Samuel Thomas von Sömmerring, Prussian physician, anatomist, paleontologist and inventor (died 1830).
- April 11 – James Parkinson, English surgeon (died 1824).
- June 15 – Antoine François, French chemist (died 1809)
- October 11 – Fausto Elhuyar, Spanish chemist (died 1833).
- October 28 – Jacques Labillardière, French naturalist (died 1834).
- Maria Elizabetha Jacson, English botanist (died 1829).

== Deaths ==
- May 20 – Johann Georg Gmelin, botanist, natural historian and geographer (born 1709)
