= Zočište Monastery =

Serbian Orthodox monastery near Rahovec, Kosovo

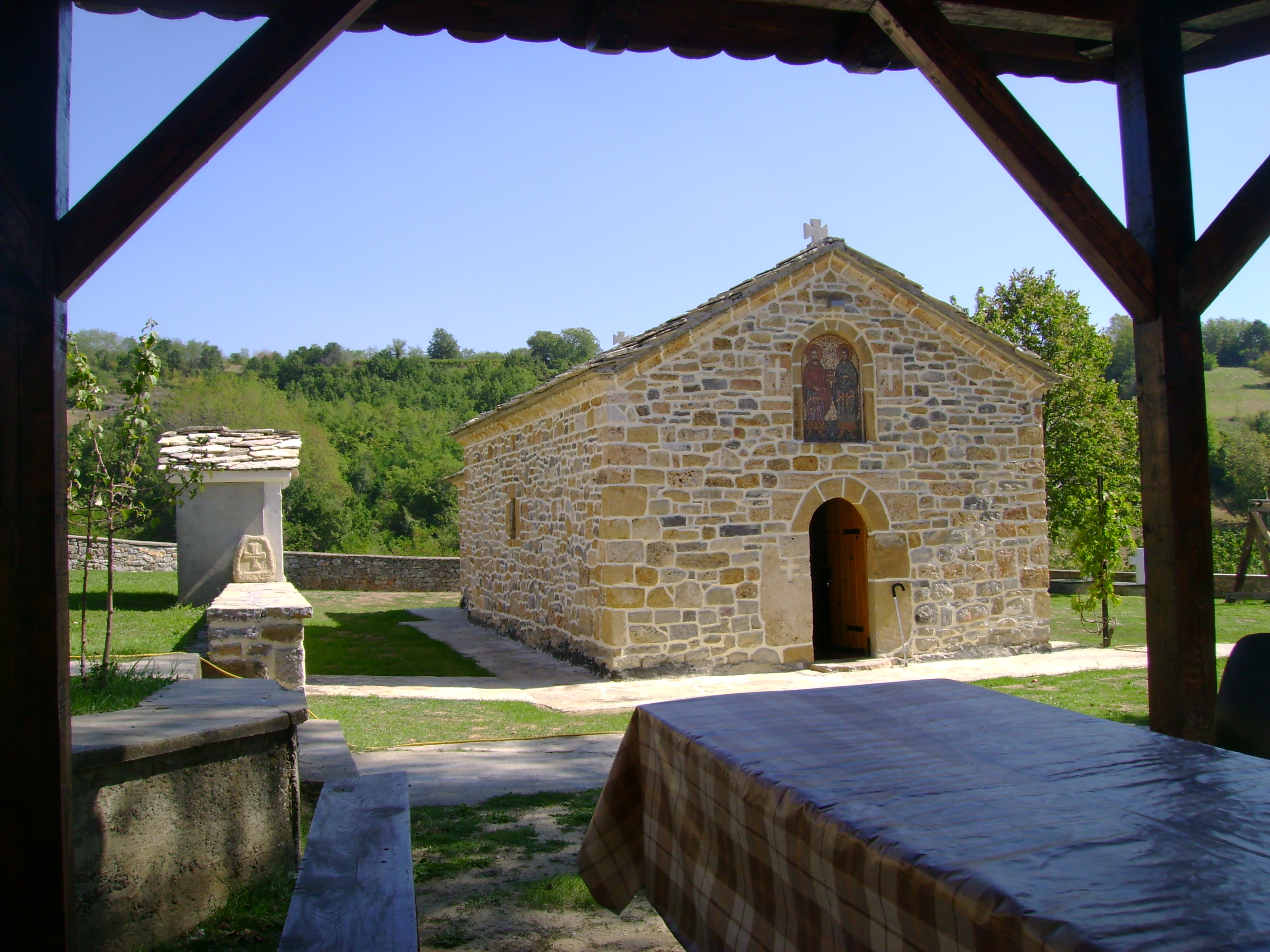
- View of the reconstructed monastery church

- Location within Kosovo
- Interactive map of Zočište Monastery

Monastery information
- Order: Serbian Orthodox
- Established: Early 14th century
- Disestablished: 1999
- Dedication: Saints Cosmas and Damian
- Diocese: Eparchy of Raška and Prizren

Site
- Location: Zočište, Kosovo
- Coordinates: 42°22′31″N 20°42′8″E

The Zočište Monastery (Serbian: Манастир Зочиште, romanized: Manastir Zočište; Albanian: Manastiri i Zoçishtës) or formally St. Cosmas and Damian's Monastery (Serbian: Манастир Св. Козме и Дамјана, romanized: Manastir Sv. Kozme i Damjana) is a Serbian Orthodox monastery belonging to the Eparchy of Raška and Prizren, situated in the village of Zočište, about 3 miles (5 km) southeast of Orahovac, Kosovo. The original church, dedicated to St. Nicholas, was built in the 13th century. The graveyard includes tombstones dating back to the 15th and 16th centuries. The monastery was renovated in the 16th century and again in 2008 after being destroyed in 1999. The Church building has been rebuilt on the existing and consolidated foundations using original building material from the ruins of the old church.

The monastery is famous for the relics of the Saints Cosmas and Damian. The shrine at the monastery was said to provide a miraculous cure for eye diseases and mental and psychosomatic disorders. It is said to be "One of the most important cultural places for Serbian and Christian settlements in the Metohija region." It was designated as Cultural Heritage of Serbia in 1954. The monastery was included into the Republic of Kosovo list of "Special Protective Zones" on 20 February 2008.

== History ==
The earliest reference to the monastery dates to 1327, during the reign of Serbian king Stefan Dečanski. It was damaged during the Battle of Kosovo in 1389. Muslims used the stones of the original building to construct a mosque in Prizren. It was rebuilt in the late 16th century following the reinstatement of the Serbian Patriarchate of Peć. In the late 17th century, it was mentioned by Ragusan merchant Nikola Bošković.

=== Kosovo War and destruction ===
Simultaneously with the KLA attack on Orahovac (17–20 July 1998), neighbouring Serb villages were attacked. Serb civilians were expelled from villages Opteruša and Retimlje. With light artillery and machine guns, the KLA attacked for 45 minutes the Zočište Monastery where thirty elderly Serbs had taken shelter, together with seven monks and a nun, and damaged the communal house with two grenades. Local Serbs told HRW that the monks resisted with four rifles for two hours before giving up. The KLA took everyone in the monastery to a school in nearby Semetište. Of the abducted Serbs, 35 were subsequently released on 22 July, and another ten on the night of 29–30 July. The fate of the other estimated forty abductees was unknown as of 2001. In 2005 remains of 47 victims were excavated in two mass graves.

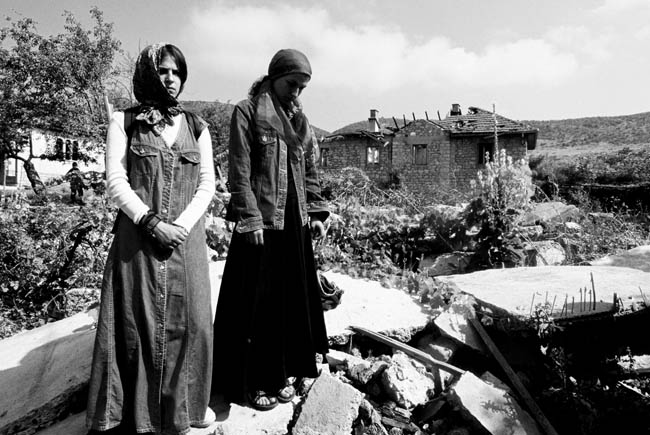
Ruins of monasteries after 2004 unrest

The monastery was destroyed by the KLA after the Kosovo War on September 13/14, 1999, looting and then torching it. The relics of Saints Cosma and Damian were transferred to Sopoćani Monastery, and main monastery bell was thrown in the well.

=== Reconstruction ===
In October 2004, monastery reconstruction started, as Zočište was important and historical cultural designation. Old stones and fragments of the destroyed church were used in reconstruction, and monastery is almost identical as it once was. In 2005, KFOR stopped reconstruction, with argument that local population opposes the restoration. When the ban was lifted, construction continued with the reconstruction of dormitories and main church building. On November 13, 2007 a bus carrying about 30 students was stoned outside the monastery.

== Description ==
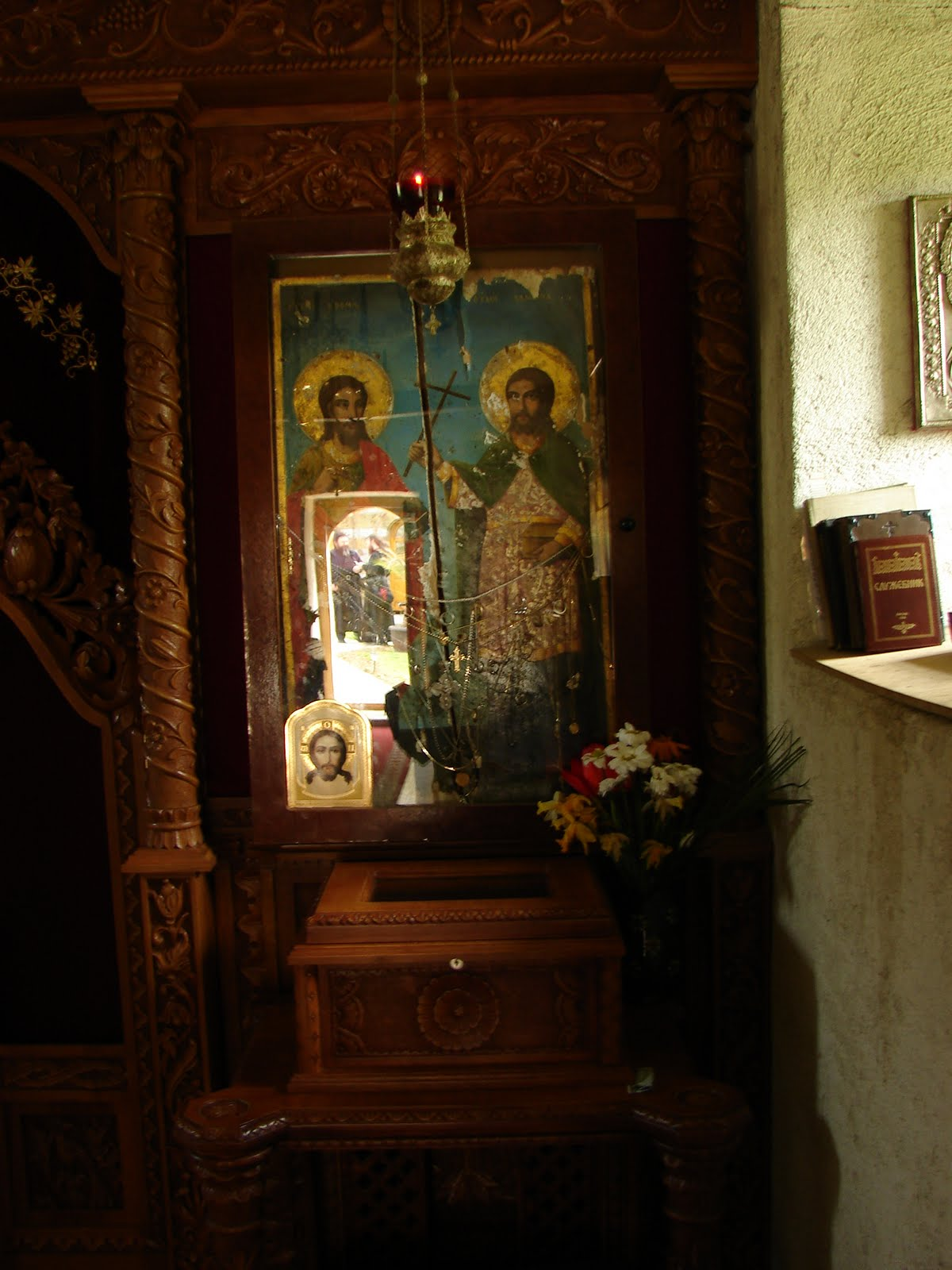
Salvaged old icon from the original 14th-century church

The church, amidst the old Serbian graveyard, built over rectangular layout with three exterior faces, comprised a single nave, linear barrel vault, with an eastern apse in semicircular shape both in the interior and exterior facade. The material used for construction consisted of dressed stones, lime mortar for binding and stone-slate roofing. The church had two niches of prothesis and diaconicon, on the eastern wall next to an altar table. As the church when remodelled functioned as funerary chapel it had a table to keep a coffin and seats for people attending the funeral.

Tell tale remains were seen in the vault and in a niche above the western entrance to the narthex; these were in the form of decorated frescos of a frieze of prophets and of the patrons SS Cosmas and Damian. When the church was destroyed in 1999, icons and liturgical vessels were retrieved and deposited in Velika Hoča for safe keeping.

The statues and figures seen in the church consisted of: St Nicholas, St Paraskeva and two Holy Warriors and fragment of the fresco of one of the officiating archbishops, on the southern wall; the figures of St Sava and St Simeon Nemanja on the west wall; the north wall had depiction of "The Vision of St Peter of Alexandria"; the east wall had the figure of the Archangel Gabriel from the Annunciation; and a niche in the prothesis had the figure of an archdeacon.

== See also ==
- List of Serbian Orthodox monasteries
