= Miloš Cvetković =

Serbian footballer

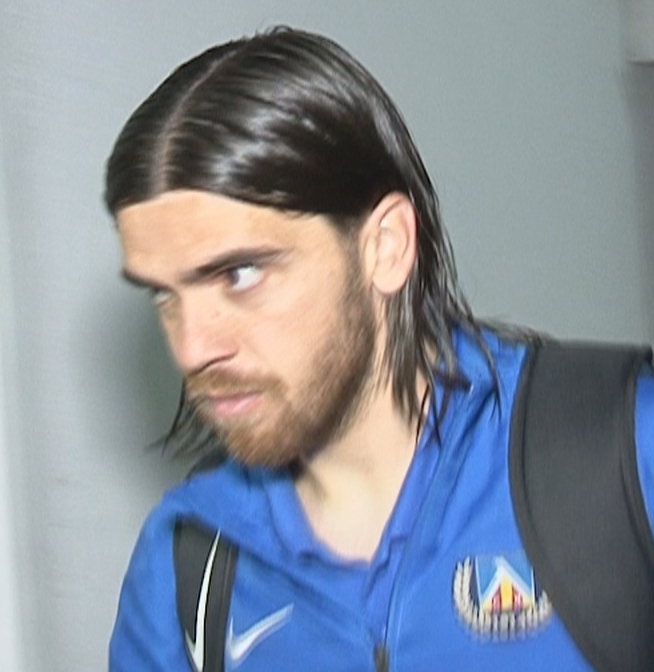

Personal information
- Full name: Miloš Cvetković
- Date of birth: 6 January 1990 (age 36)
- Place of birth: Belgrade, SFR Yugoslavia
- Height: 1.75 m (5 ft 9 in)
- Position: Right-back

Team information
- Current team: Mladost Lučani
- Number: 44

Youth career
- 2000–2005: Red Star Belgrade
- 2005–2007: Zemun

Senior career*
Years	Team	Apps	(Gls)
2007–2011	Zemun	71	(0)
2011	Rad	0	(0)
2011	→ Palić (loan)	10	(0)
2012–2013	Hajduk Kula	33	(1)
2013–2014	Napredak Kruševac	37	(0)
2015–2016	Red Star Belgrade	24	(1)
2017	Napredak Kruševac	10	(0)
2017–2019	Levski Sofia	57	(0)
2020–2022	Mladost Lučani	63	(2)
2022–2024	TSC	58	(3)
2024–2026	Čukarički	38	(0)
2026–	Mladost Lučani	0	(0)

International career
2009	Serbia U19	5	(0)
- * Club domestic league appearances and goals as of 12 June 2026

Miloš Cvetković (Serbian Cyrillic: Милош Цветковић; born 6 January 1990) is a Serbian footballer who plays as a right-back for Mladost Lučani.

== Club career ==
=== Zemun ===
Born in Belgrade, Cvetković joined FK Zemun in 2005, where he ended youth career and later started playing professional football. Previously he was a member of Red Star Belgrade youth categories. Cvetković made his senior debut on 10 November 2007 at the age of 17, replacing Boško Čvorkov in the second half of match against RFK Novi Sad. He also played one more match, against OFK Mladenovac until the end of 2007–08 season. After the club relegated from the Serbian First League, Cvetković made 24 appearances for the 2008–09 Serbian League Belgrade season, contributing to the return of the club to a higher rank. He also had 45 First League caps for Zemun between 2009 and 2011.

=== Rad ===
Miloš joined FK Rad in summer 2011, but he was loaned to Palić a shortly after, where he spent the first half of the 2011–12 season. He made 10 appearances in the Serbian League Vojvodina for Palić with average rating 7.05.

=== Hajduk Kula ===
At the beginning of 2012, Cvetković moved to Hajduk Kula. He joined the club as a reserve for Branko Pauljević, but also appeared as a left-back until the end of 2011–12 Serbian SuperLiga season. After his first SuperLiga season, Cvetković started new season as a back-up player, but later he became the first choice on the right-back position. He scored a goal in the match against Vojvodina, played on 20 October 2012. During the season, he also played as a left-back and defensive midfielder. He left the club as a free agent after the club dissolved.

=== Napredak Kruševac ===
In summer 2013, Cvetković signed a three-year contract with Napredak Kruševac. He played 27 league and 2 cup matches for the 2013–14 season. He also played with club in the first half of 2014–15 season, making 10 league and 1 cup appearance.

=== Red Star Belgrade ===
After Marko Petković's injury, Cvetković joined Red Star Belgrade by Nenad Lalatović's recommendation. He signed a two-year contract with club in December 2014. He made 14 appearances until the end of season and scored 1 goal, against Novi Pazar. After Miodrag Božović replaced Lalatović on the first team coach, Cvetković also started 2015–16 season as the first choice, but later moved on the bench and spent the mostly time as a reserve player for the rest of season, and also missed some period because of injury. For the new season, Božović started using Cvetković as the first choice on the right-back position. Despite a defeat, he was one of the better players in the defense line at home debacle match against Ludogorets Razgrad in 2nd leg of the 2016–17 UEFA Champions League third qualifying round. He also made assist on his first appearance in the 2016–17 Serbian SuperLiga season, against Voždovac. After the end of contract, Cvetković left the club.

=== Return to Napredak Kruševac ===
In February 2017, Cvetković returned to Napredak Kruševac.

=== Levski Sofia ===
On 16 June 2017, Cvetković signed with Bulgarian club Levski Sofia for 2+1 years.

== Career statistics ==
As of 1 July 2019

Club	Season	League			Cup		Continental		Other		Total	
Club	Season	Division	Apps	Goals	Apps	Goals	Apps	Goals	Apps	Goals	Apps	Goals
Zemun	2007–08	Serbian First League	2	0	—		—		—		2	0
Zemun	2008–09	Serbian League Belgrade	24	0	—		—		—		24	0
Zemun	2009–10	Serbian First League	31	0	—		—		—		31	0
Zemun	2010–11	Serbian First League	14	0	—		—		—		14	0
Zemun	Total		71	0	—		—		—		71	0
Rad	2011–12	Serbian SuperLiga	0	0	—		—		—		0	0
Palić (loan)	2011–12	Serbian League Vojvodina	10	0	—		—		—		10	0
Hajduk Kula	2011–12	Serbian SuperLiga	8	0	—		—		—		8	0
Hajduk Kula	2012–13	Serbian SuperLiga	25	1	2	0	—		—		27	1
Hajduk Kula	Total		33	1	2	0	—		—		35	1
Napredak Kruševac	2013–14	Serbian SuperLiga	27	0	2	0	—		—		29	0
Napredak Kruševac	2014–15	Serbian SuperLiga	10	0	1	0	—		—		11	0
Napredak Kruševac	Total		37	0	3	0	—		—		40	0
Red Star Belgrade	2014–15	Serbian SuperLiga	14	1	—		—		—		14	1
Red Star Belgrade	2015–16	Serbian SuperLiga	8	0	1	0	2	0	—		11	0
Red Star Belgrade	2016–17	Serbian SuperLiga	2	0	0	0	6	0	—		8	0
Red Star Belgrade	Total		24	1	1	0	8	0	—		33	1
Napredak Kruševac	2016–17	Serbian SuperLiga	10	0	—		—		—		10	0
Levski Sofia	2017–18	Bulgarian First League	29	0	4	0	4	0	—		37	0
Levski Sofia	2018–19	Bulgarian First League	28	0	2	0	2	0	—		32	0
Levski Sofia	Total		57	0	6	0	6	0	—		69	0
Career total			242	2	12	0	14	0	—		268	2

== Honours ==
Zemun

- Serbian League Belgrade: 2008–09

Red Star Belgrade

- Serbian SuperLiga: 2015–16

Individual

- Serbian SuperLiga Team of the Season: 2022–23
