= Anica Bošković =

Anica Bošković (1714 – 13 August 1804) was a Ragusan writer. Hers was one of the first important women's names in Ragusan literature.

== Biography ==
Her work, The Dialogue (1758), was the first and only literary work written by a female author in the literature of Ragusa.

She wrote a pastoral song and translated from the Italian language. Christian themes permeate her work.

She was born in Dubrovnik, Republic of Ragusa to Nikola Bošković, a Ragusan merchant, and Paola Bettera (1674–1777), scion of a wealthy family, on either November 3 or December 3, 1714, the youngest of nine children. One of her brothers, Roger Joseph Boscovich, was a notable polymath, and two other brothers, the Latinist Baro Bošković and the poet Petar Bošković, contributed to Ragusan culture.

She died as the last child of the family of Nikola and Pava Bošković. She died in Ragusa on 12 August 1804. She was buried next to her mother in the Franciscan church on Stradun in Dubrovnik. The "Anica Bošković" Society erected a tombstone in 1939.

She never married. In addition to Serbo-Croat, she spoke Latin, French, and Italian.
