= BOSCO-Uganda =

Ugandan nonprofit organization

BOSCO Uganda
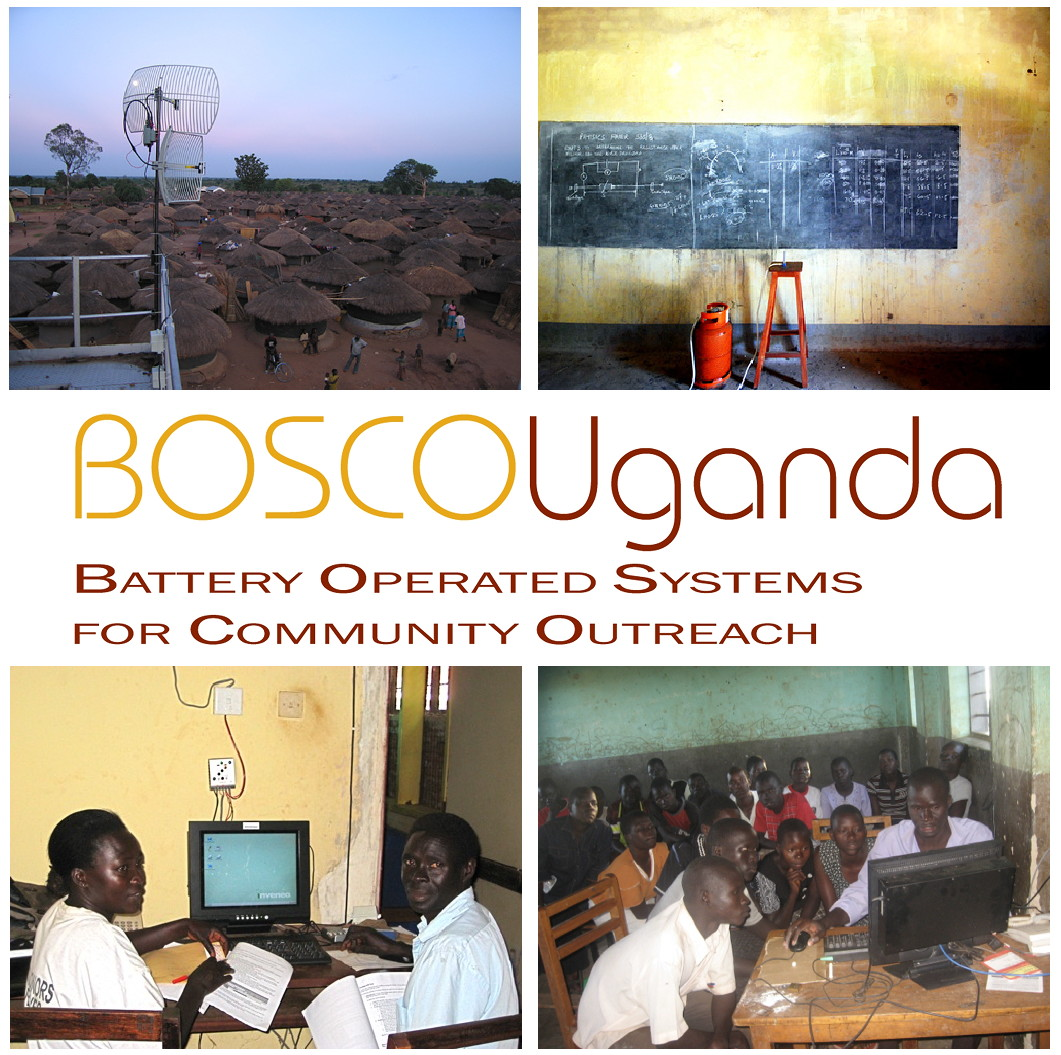
- Company type: Nonprofit
- Founded: March 9, 2007; 19 years ago
- Founders: Gus Zuehlke and Fr. Joseph Okumu
- Headquarters: Uganda / United States
- Area served: Northern Uganda
- Key people: Gus Zuehlke (President); Thomas Loughran (Vice President); Daniel Komakech (Executive Director)
- Website: www.boscouganda.com

Battery Operated Systems for Community Outreach (BOSCO) Uganda is a nonprofit organization under the trusteeship of the Catholic Archdiocese of Gulu with registration number B9410051328-N registered on March 9, 2007. The organization initially started as a collaboration between friends from Gulu, Uganda and the United States of America, who thought of using ICT to help end the isolation of communities in the IDP camps, by setting up ICT centers in the camps and connecting one ICT Centre with another.

BOSCO is also named in honor of the Roman Catholic Saint John Bosco. BOSCO collaborated with Inveneo to place their low-power PCs powered by solar panels in the Catechist Training Center and the Caritas Office in Gulu, as well as at schools, hospitals, colleges and Churches in Pabbo, Alero, Lacor, Coope, Jen'Geri, Unyama, and Pagak IDP camps. The organization aims to use ICT to help end the isolation of communities in rural northern Uganda as well as to improve education, economics, human rights, documentation, health care and rural development.

BOSCO has established 55 community ICT & Development Centers in rural areas in Acholi, Lango and West Nile regions to bridge the digital divide between rural and urban communities.

== Regional history ==
Twenty years of conflict and displacement have isolated the people of northern Uganda from the technological developments rapidly evolving in their own country and throughout the world. This isolation and lack of access to 21st century Information and Communication Technologies (ICT) have prevented communities from using the Internet for creative and innovative ways to meet community needs.

Instead, many communities have become reliant on traditional aid. However, with peace in northern Uganda, BOSCO-Uganda attempts to turn dependency into self-advocacy through the use of innovative and collaborative ICT technologies.

Initiated in 2006 under the umbrella of Gulu Archdiocese, BOSCO-Uganda implemented a pilot ICT project in 6 IDP-camps in Gulu and Amuru district (including CooPe, Unyama, Lacor, Pagak, Pabbo and Jengari) BOSCO-Uganda has since expanded its activities in Amuru and Gulu and is planning the further expansion to Kitgum and Pader Districts.

BOSCO-Uganda uses innovative technology particularly adapted to rural regions. Its internet stations, situated in rural communities and former internally displaced persons camps, consist of low-power, solar powered PCs connected to a high-speed, long-range WiFi Internet connection. Each communication station is linked to other BOSCO sites via a free VoIP telephony network and through a high-speed internal network (INTERNET) content management page.

Moving beyond the provision of technical solutions, BOSCO is concentrating on the development of both proven and emerging directions for ICT usage. These directions include computer education adapted to the realities of 21st Century global interconnectivity and a Web 2.0 collaborative approach to cooperation with health centers, e-agriculture, educational outreach, e-government, etc.

== Organizational history ==
BOSCO USA was founded by Gus Zuehlke in 2007. Zuehlke established relationships with the Archdiocese of Gulu, including the Archbishop John Baptist Odama and Fr. Joseph Okumu, with whom he later co-founded the organization. In 2007, northern Uganda was benefiting from a tenuous cease fire, yet nearly 1.7 million people throughout the region remained stuck and isolated in Internally Displaced Persons (IDP) camps.

Zuehike discussed some of the needs and challenges the archdiocese and the people were facing. The Archbishop's priority was to help the Acholi people of northern Uganda end the severe isolation they were experiencing in the camps. By connecting camp schools, community centers, parishes, and health clinics to the outside world through Internet, the Acholi people could begin to end their isolation by advocating for their own cause.

In 2007, Zuehlke assembled an all-volunteer Board of Directors and incorporated BOSCO, Inc. as a 501(c)(3) not for profit organization. In April 2007, with the help of Inveneo and BOSCO's Founding Technical Director, Ted Pethick, BOSCO deployed the first set of low power, solar, PCs with long-range Internet in 6 site locations.

== BOSCO-USA ==
=== Role ===
Since the founding, BOSCO USA, based in South Bend, Indiana, has taken on a distinct role for BOSCO-Uganda. BOSCO-Uganda, in Gulu, handles the day-to-day operations of the organization and employs a local, Ugandan staff. BOSCO-USA consists only of a volunteer Board of Directors who are mainly responsible for these points:

1. Capacity building: BOSCO-USA periodically sends technical staff on training trips to Gulu; BOSCO-USA has also supported the work of a full-time Gulu-based communications envoy to report on-the-ground progress in Gulu
2. Vetting of technology: BOSCO-USA is engaged in assessing the trends of low-power computing and wireless networking equipment and passes on equipment recommendations to BOSCO-Uganda staff. BOSCO-USA is also involved in shipping some equipment for deployments to Uganda
3. Public Relations: BOSCO-USA actively promotes the BOSCO project in the US with media outlets and in various communities
4. Fundraising in US: BOSCO-USA raised the initial capital to start the project and is involved in fundraising to support the work of BOSCO-Uganda in Gulu.

=== Leadership ===
The BOSCO-USA Board of Directors is made-up entirely of volunteers. The notable members of this board are Gus Zuehlke (President and Founder), Thomas Loughran (Vice President), Kerry Vickers (Technical Consultant) and Kevin Bailey (Former Organizational & Communications Envoy in Uganda). With the help of other board members, these individuals consult with BOSCO-Uganda and aid in fundraising, technology, capacity and public relations.

=== Role ===
BOSCO-Uganda is primarily involved in the day-to-day implementation of the BOSCO project. This includes:

1. Managing all Internet sites in the Amuru and Gulu Districts in northern Uganda.
2. Developing content, with a focus on education and peace building, for BOSCO's Intranet system.
3. Supporting the expansion of BOSCO-Uganda through new proposals and partnerships.
4. Managing communications between local, regional and international stakeholders in partnership with BOSCO USA.

=== Leadership ===
The BOSCO-Uganda leadership employs a Uganda-based staff and administration. They have overseen the network expansion and are the essential component for BOSCOs attempts to promote self-advocacy through ICT. This leadership oversees the daily implementation of the BOSCO mission and ensures successful use of the network at each site. They aid in developing new BOSCO content, create proposals for expansion, seek mutually beneficial partnerships, and assist in creating dialog between local users, BOSCO stakeholders, and the BOSCO team. The Ugandan team is currently led by Jennifer Okusia Erejo as its executive director having joined the organization early last year in 2020 from HORIZONT3000 to replace former Executive Director Joseph Okumu, who was at the helm of the organization for thirteen years.

== Partners ==
=== HORIZONT3000 – Austrian Organization for Development Co-operation ===
BOSCO-Uganda has partnered with HORIZONT3000 since 2007. They first provided a technical volunteer in 2007–2008 and then provided a technical advisor. The organization has also provided funding in the past for projects and staff salaries.

=== UNICEF ===
UNICEF has provided an initial grant of $10,000 to carry out community ICT trainings and install five Internet sites. A second grant worth an estimated $270,000 has been submitted and would support BOSCO's expansion by providing new computers and bandwidth, strengthening training programs at all sites in Gulu and Amuru, and installing news sites in Pader and Kitgum district. UNICEF's ICT4D department in Kampala also works in partnership with BOSCO-Uganda to develop concepts on technology and collaboration.

=== War Child Holland ===
War Child Holland has partnered with BOSCO-Uganda in Pagak. War Child Holland provided computers and a working space and BOSCO-Uganda provided Internet connectivity and training. Another site has been installed in partnership with War Child Holland at a school in Koch Goma.

=== H&S Italia ===
The software company based in Italy donated 20,000 Euros to BOSCO-Uganda's work.

=== University of Notre Dame ===
The University of Notre Dame partners with BOSCO-Uganda on an internship program where the university funds a student's work with BOSCO-Uganda over a period of 10 weeks.

== Notable awards ==
=== Breaking Borders Award ===
Google, Global Voices and Thomson Reuters partnered to create the Breaking Borders Award. This award rewards individuals or organizations spearheading web-based projects. The recipients must have demonstrated bravery, outstanding effort and ingenuity through use of the Internet. Winners of this award must be using the Internet to encourage free speech and reveal varied political opinions. The award goes to those organizations making difference in these areas as well as those helping to stand up against censorship. The award attempts to promote resourcefulness and originality for public benefit.

The Breaking Borders Award was presented to BOSCO-Uganda on May 5, 2010. This occurred at the Global Voices Citizen Media Summit in Santiago, Chile.

=== African Rural Connect First Round Winner ===
The National Peace Corps Association (NPCA) presents the Africa Rural Connect award. The ARC endorses collective thought supporting the creation of new ideas. The ideas are aimed at solving the principal challenges rural Africa faces. Close to 100 organizational ideas and charitable plans were submitted for the 2010 ARC competition.

Throughout a large variety of plans present two winners were chosen in the first round. The NPCA announced BOSCO and their proposal, “Achieving Rural Literacy through Innovative Web 2.0 ICT Use in Post-conflict Northern Uganda,” as one of the two first round winners in June 2010.
