= Orahov Do =

Orahov Do Орахов До
- Village
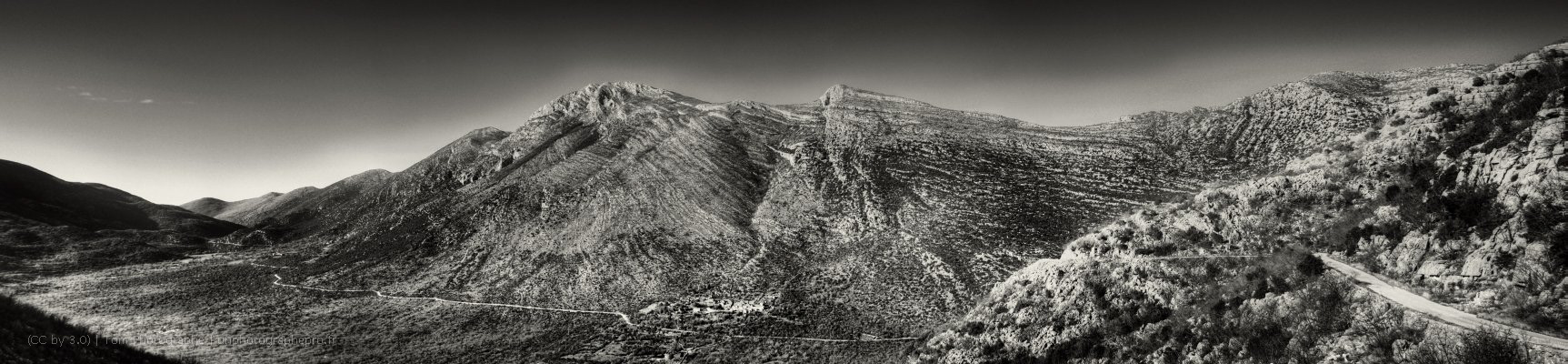
- Panorama

- Location within Bosnia and Herzegovina
- Country: Bosnia and Herzegovina
- Entity: Federation of Bosnia and Herzegovina
- Canton: Herzegovina-Neretva
- Municipality: Ravno

Area
  - Total: 8.71 sq mi (22.57 km^{2})

Population (2013)
  - Total: 151
  - Density: 17.3/sq mi (6.69/km^{2})
- Time zone: UTC+1 (CET)
  - Summer (DST): UTC+2 (CEST)

Orahov Do (Serbian Cyrillic: Орахов До) is a village in Ravno municipality Bosnia and Herzegovina. It was formerly part of the Trebinje municipality, up until the Bosnian War. It is only a few kilometers away from the border with Croatia on the road from the Adriatic coast to Popovo polje. It was the birthplace of Ragusan merchant Nikola Bošković, father of famed astronomer Ruđer Bošković.

== Name ==
The literal translation of Orahov Do is "Walnut Valley". Other variants include Orahovi Do, Orovi Do, and Orahovo. In Serbian Cyrillic, the name is written as "Орахов До".

== History ==
In a Dubrovnik court file from 1284 the village of Orahov Do is mentioned with the name Orahovec(Oraxouech). The village is mentioned in Ragusan documents dating to July 1405 (as Horachindol), 1408 (as Orachouo dol) and 1414 (as Oracouodol). The 1405 document mentions Novak Grgurić as a subject of vojvoda Sandalj Hranić. The 1408 document mentions nobleman Pokrajac Novaković's granting his subject, Novak Grgurić, from Orahov Do to settle with his family in the Ston region. The 1414 document mentions Radonja Pripković from the village. During the Middle Ages the region was part of the župa (county) of Popovo. In 1475 the village was called Rahov Do and was inhabited by 23 families. The village was burned by the Ottomans in 1687. In 1692 during the mass Don Ilija Bošković uncle of Ruđer Bošković was killed by Uskoks. In 1624 the list of Fr. Blaz Gračanin states that the village contained 19 Catholic houses and about 100 Catholics, and In 1639 the list of Fr. Dominik Andrijasević village has 14 Catholic families. According to the Austro-Hungarian Census from 1879 Orahov Do there lived only Catholics.

During the Great Turkish War in 1689, Hajduks attacked Orahov Do, Nijev Do and Balenići on the order of serdar Nonković.

== Demographics ==
The village is inhabited by a Croat majority and Serb minority. In the 1991 census, the village had 42 residents, including:

- 38 (90.47%) Croats
- 4 (9.52%) Serbs

According to the 2013 census, its population was 151, all Croats.

== Anthropology ==
Surnames found in the village include Burum, Kristić, Đurinov, Čupović, Bjelanov, Delić, Zurević, Cajin, Pirijač, Kićunov, and others.

According to Serbian sources, the Bošković brotherhood (ancestors of Roger Joseph Boscovich), originally surnamed Pokrajčić, had settled the village from the surrounding mountains. Branches of the brotherhood also settled the surroundings of Stolac.

== Notable people ==
- Dominik Andrijašević (1572–1639), Ragusan Franciscan bishop
- Benedikt Orsini (fl. 1629–1637), Ragusan Franciscan bishop
- Nikola Bošković (1642–1721), Ragusan trader and father of Roger Joseph Boscovich

== Sources ==
- Dunić, Mihailo (1967). Les Familles nobles de Hum et de Trebinje ... Académie serbe des sciences et des arts.
- Društvo, Srpsko Geografsko (1926). Гласник Српског географског друштва. Vol. 12–14. pp. 79–80.
- Mihić, Ljubo (1975). Ljubinje sa okolinom. Dragan Srnić. pp. 190, 777–779.
