= Boškovići =

Boškovići may refer to:

- Boškovići (Goražde)
- Boškovići (Laktaši)
- Boškovići (Zvornik)

== See also ==
- Bošković, surname
