= Boska =

Boska may refer to:

- Karl-Heinz Boska (1920–2004), a Hauptsturmführer (Chief Storm Leader/Captain) in the Waffen-SS during World War II
- Boska gej, a village in the administrative district of Gmina Stromiec, Białobrzegi County, Masovian Voivodeship, east-central Poland
- Avia BH-5, two-seat sport aircraft built in Czechoslovakia in 1923

== See also ==
- Bosko (disambiguation)
