= Bosko (disambiguation) =

Bosko is an animated character.

Bosko may also refer to:

- "Bosko", a police detective in the film Heat portrayed by Ted Levine
- "Bosko", character in All the Right Moves
- Boško, a Serbo-Croatian male given name
- Oswald Bosko (died 1944), Austrian from Vienna who became a sergeant in the German Army

== See also ==
- Bosco (disambiguation)
- Boska (disambiguation)
