= Dominik Andrijašević =

Ragusan Franciscan friar

Dominik Andrijašević (Italian: Domenico Andreassi, Latin: Dominicus Andriasius/Dominicus Andreassius; 1572–1639), was a Ragusan Franciscan friar who served as the Catholic Bishop of Shkodër (Scutari) (1622–24) and later Mostar (1637).

== Life ==
Born in 1572 in Orahov Do in Herzegovina, Andrijašević was a resident in Ragusa (Dubrovnik).

He was sent with Damjan Ljubibratić several times to the Popes with petitions of aid in Balkan uprisings.

In 1608, Andrijašević arrived in Ragusa (Dubrovnik) from Spain with letters for Grdan.

In 1624, the Ottomans expelled him from Scutari.

== Legacy ==
Andrijašević was a member of the Andrijašević-Mrše family of the Slano region.
