= Zočište =

Zočište: Zoçishtë (Albanian); Зочиште/Zočište (Serbian)
- Village
- Location in Kosovo
- Coordinates: 42°22′31″N 20°42′08″E
- Location: Kosovo
- District: Gjakova
- Municipality: Rahovec

Population (2024)
  - Total: 399
- Time zone: UTC+1 (CET)
  - Summer (DST): UTC+2 (CEST)

Zočište (Serbian Cyrillic: Зочиште; Albanian: Zoçishtë) is a village in the Rahovec Municipality in western Kosovo.

== History ==
Zočište is first mentioned in a chrysobull by the Serbian King Stefan Dečanski in 1327. In the same year, the Serbian Orthodox Zočište Monastery was constructed and Zočište was famed for being the site of a holy well that purportedly cured eye diseases. The significance of this well is evident in that the origin of the villages name Zočište, stems from the Serbian phrase za oči, meaning for eyes. Up until the 1990s, the village hosted a large number of Serbian and Albanian pilgrims with large scale festivities occurring yearly on July 14. The pilgrims came seeking blessings for eye diseases and psychiatric conditions.

During the Kosovo War, the village was attacked by the Kosovo Liberation Army as part of a wider offensive in the region. Local Serbs in Zočište sought refuge in the local monastery which was hit by machine gun fire and grenades. Despite resisting for two hours, the local Serbs including the Serbian Orthodox clergy surrendered. Following the end of the Kosovo War on 14 June 1999, the entire Serb population of Zočište left after ethnic Albanian extremists burned their homes including the local Zočište Monastery. In September of the same year, the remains of the church were completely destroyed by explosives.

== Demographics ==
In 2024, the village had 399 inhabitants, all of them Albanians.
