= Magda Bošković =

Croatian communist, Partisan and activist (1914–1942)

- Born: 3 November 1914; Osijek, Kingdom of Croatia-Slavonia, Austria-Hungary
- Died: spring 1942 (aged 27); Stara Gradiška, Independent State of Croatia
- Cause of death: Murdered in the Holocaust
- Education: University of Zagreb
- Occupation: Clerk
- Parents: Dragutin Bošković; Ivanka Szarvas
- Relatives: Maja Bošković-Stulli (sister)

Magda Bošković (3 November 1914 – 1942) was a Croatian communist, Partisan and member of the women's rights movement.

Bošković was born in Osijek to a Jewish family of Dragutin Bošković and Ivanka (Janka) Szarvas. Her father was clerk at the bank, and her mother was a housewife. Bošković was raised with younger sister Maja. In 1923, she moved with her family to Zagreb, Yugoslavia. Bošković finished elementary school and gymnasium in Zagreb. She later graduated from the Faculty of Economics and Business, University of Zagreb.

In 1932, Bošković was among the founders of Marxist group at the University of Zagreb. In 1934, she joined the Young Communist League of Yugoslavia and was elected as a board member of the student section in the Women's movement. Bošković also worked on the accepting the Yugoslav volunteers who went to Spain to join the International Brigades in fight against Spanish Nationalists. She was an editor of the papers Naše novine (Our Papers) and Ženski svijet (Women's World). After graduation Bošković worked as a clerk at the sawmill company Neuschloß, Schmidt und Marchetti (later Našička d.d.). She worked in Đurđenovac and later in Zagreb. Bošković was active in the women's rights movement across Yugoslavia. After the invasion of Yugoslavia in 1941, Bošković joined the resistance movement in Croatia. She was a member of the Women's Antifascist Front of Croatia and council member of the Društvo za prosvjetu žena (Society for education of women).

In 1942, Bošković was arrested and imprisoned at Savska cesta prison. Later she was deported to Stara Gradiška concentration camp where she was killed by the Ustashas. Her parents were also killed during the Holocaust, while only her sister managed to survive.

== Bibliography ==
- Knežević, Snješka; Laslo, Aleksander (2011). Židovski Zagreb. Zagreb: AGM, Židovska općina Zagreb. ISBN 978-953-174-393-8.
- Romano, Jaša (1980). Jevreji Jugoslavije 1941-1945: žrtve genocida i učesnici narodnooslobodilačkog rata. Beograd: Jevrejski Istorijski Muzej, Saveza jevrejskih opština Jugoslavije.
- Kraus, Ognjen (1998). Dva stoljeća povijesti i kulture Židova u Zagrebu i Hrvatskoj. Zagreb: Židovska općina Zagreb. ISBN 953-96836-2-9.
