= Boško Minić =

Serbian footballer

Personal information
- Full name: Boško Minić
- Date of birth: 24 October 1966 (age 60)
- Place of birth: Pančevo, SFR Yugoslavia
- Height: 1.90 m (6 ft 3 in)
- Position: Forward

Youth career
- Dinamo Pančevo

Senior career*
Years	Team	Apps	(Gls)
- Dinamo Pančevo
1989–?	Arles-Avignon		
- Dinamo Pančevo
1995	Chunnam Dragons	22	(1)
- * Club domestic league appearances and goals

Boško Minić (born 24 October 1966) is a Serbian retired footballer who played as a striker.

== Club career ==
He played for Jeonnam Dragons of the South Korean K League.
