= Horizont3000 =

Austrian non-profit organization

- Formation: 2000; 26 years ago
- Type: International NGO
- Legal status: Active
- Purpose: Development Aid
- Headquarters: Vienna, Austria
- Region served: Central America, East Africa
- Managing Director: Erwin Eder
- Website: www.horizont3000.org

Horizont3000 is an Austrian non-profit organization (NPO) that works in the field of development cooperation. Founded in 2000 under its current name, the organization is based in the 16th district of Vienna, Austria, and operates regional offices in Managua, Nicaragua, and Kampala, Uganda, as well as two country offices in Diamniadio, Senegal, and Beira, Mozambique. Its geographical focus lies on Central America and East Africa. However, Horizont3000 also manages projects in several other countries where it does not operate a physical on-site office, including Colombia, Brazil, Ethiopia, Rwanda, and Moldova. Up until 2021, the organization also operated an office in Papua New Guinea, which was closed after thirty years of programmatic work in the country. Horizont3000 currently runs programs focused on two key areas: Human Rights & Civil Society and Sustainable Livelihoods. Horizont3000 collaborates with nearly 100 partner organizations and locally led initiatives through co-financing based on grant schemes, medium- to long-term advisory services, and knowledge management initiatives.

== History ==
Horizont3000 is one of Austria's oldest and largest non-governmental development cooperation organizations. It was established in 2000 as a result of a merger of the Austrian Development Service (ÖED), the Institute for International Cooperation (IIZ), and the Co-Financing Agency for Development Cooperation (KFS) in an effort to increase efficiency and harness synergies. The predecessor organizations of Horizont3000 had been active in development cooperation for several decades.

== Vision ==
According to the organization's annual report, the Horizont3000 vision is: "Buen vivir for all: We strive for harmonious, collective development."

== Programmatic work ==
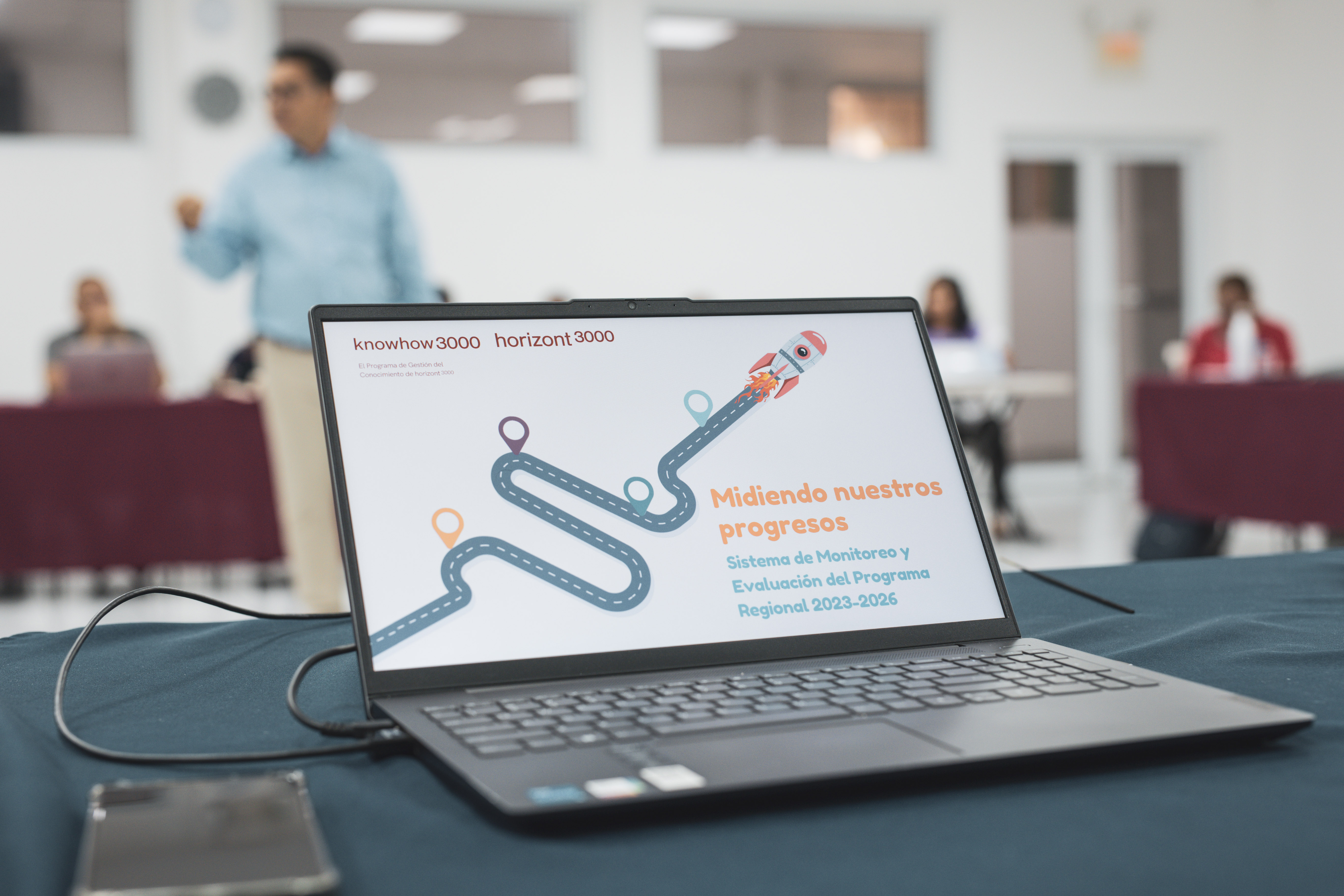
Monitoring & Evaluation Workshop hosted by Horizont3000

Horizont3000 focuses its programmatic work in the following key areas:

1. Secure Livelihoods: Enhancing economic development, improving livelihoods, and supporting sustainable agricultural practices.
2. Human Rights and Civil Society: Promoting human rights, strengthening democratic processes, and supporting civil society organizations.

Within these two key pillars of work, the programmatic activities of Horizont3000 place particular emphasis on gender equality, climate protection and policy dialogue. In 2023, the organization implemented a total of 183 projects with close to 100 partner organizations.

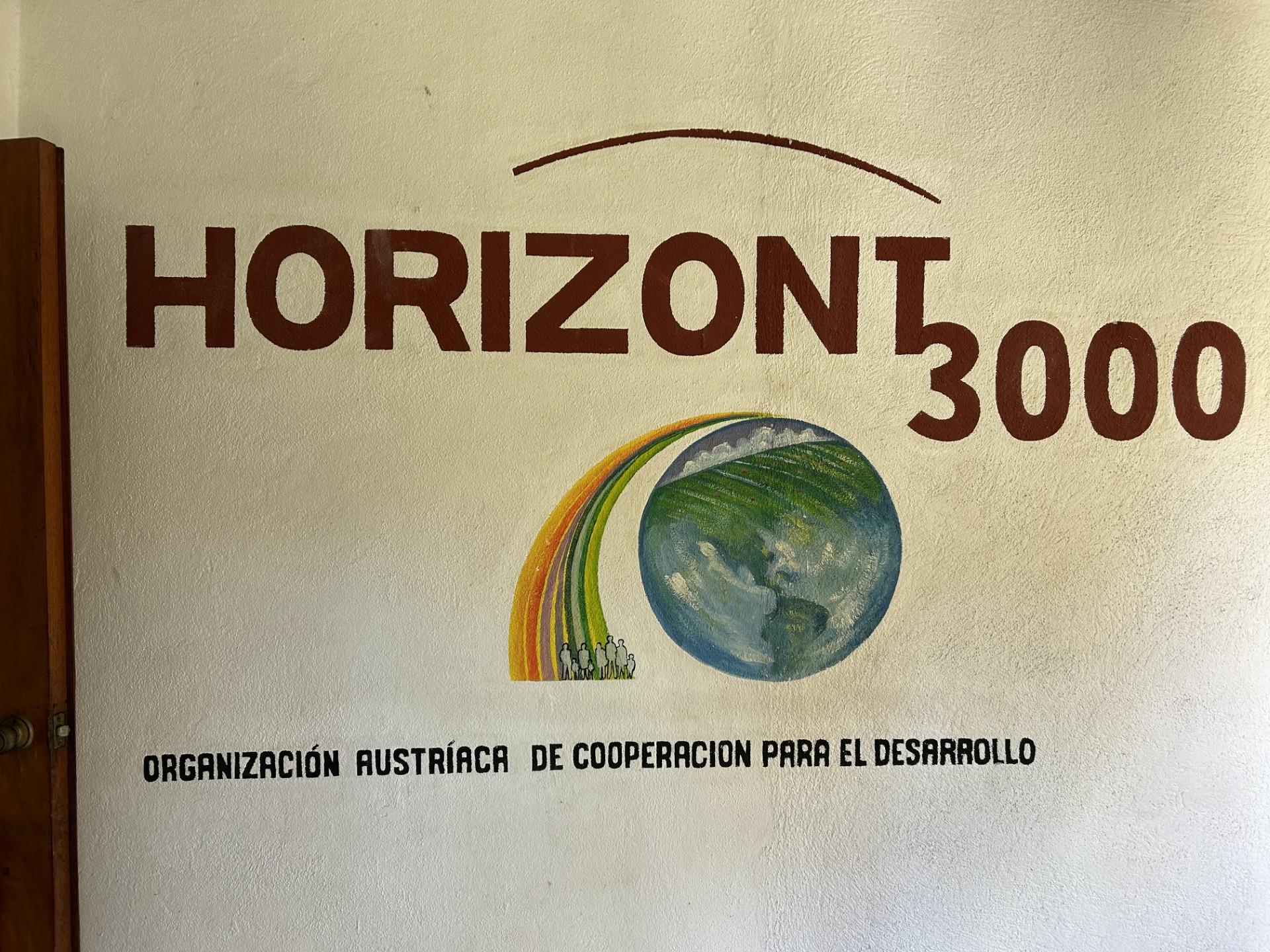
Horizont3000 Regional Office in Central America

== Funding & budget ==
Horizont3000 receives funding from multiple different sources, including its member organizations (a total of eleven Austrian Catholic grassroots organizations), the Austrian Development Cooperation (ADC), the City of Vienna, individual donors as well as international bodies, including the European Union. In 2023, the Austrian Development Cooperation, which operates under the Austrian Federal Ministry of European and International Affairs, accounted for a vast portion of the organization's total budget. Some of the organization's key donors include a number of Austrian Catholic organizations, such as Caritas, "Sei So Frei" Upper Austria, Dreikönigsaktion der österreichischen Jungschar (DKA) and the Austrian Catholic Women's Movement.
