= Boško Petrović (footballer) =

Serbian footballer

Personal information
- Date of birth: 20 April 1975 (age 51)
- Height: 1.92 m (6 ft 3 1/2 in)
- Position: Defender

Youth career
- Rad

Senior career*
Years	Team	Apps	(Gls)
2000	Rad	11	(0)
2001	Alania Vladikavkaz	2	(0)
2005–2006	Sileks	21	(0)
2006–2007	Javor Ivanjica	30	(0)
- * Club domestic league appearances and goals

Boško Petrović (Serbian Cyrillic: Бошко Петровић; born 20 April 1975) is a Serbian retired football player.
