= Boscovich (crater) =

Crater on the Moon

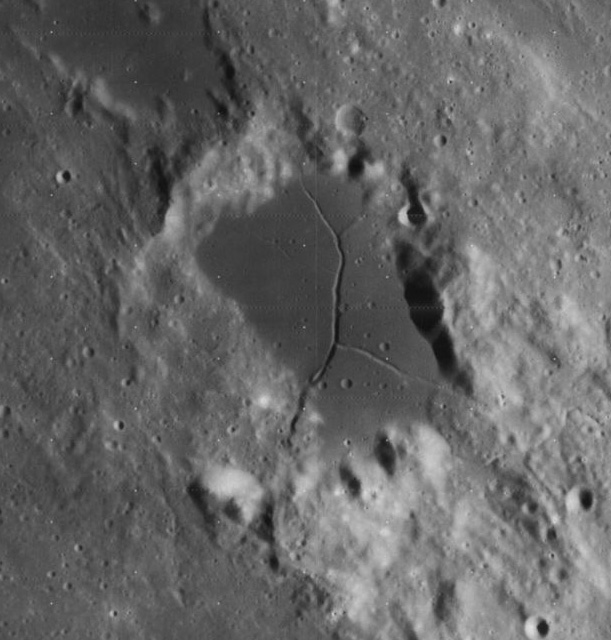
- Lunar Orbiter 4 image
- Coordinates: 9.8°N 11.1°E
- Diameter: 41.53 km (25.81 mi)
- Depth: 1.78 km (1.11 mi) (?)
- Colongitude: 349° at sunrise
- Eponym: Roger Joseph Boscovich

Boscovich is a lunar impact crater that has been almost completely eroded away by subsequent impacts. It is located west-northwest of the crater Julius Caesar, and south-southeast of the prominent Manilius. T. W. Webb described it as a very dark enclosure. It is an irregular formation with a low outer wall. The crater floor has a low albedo, and the dark hue makes it relatively easy to recognize. The surface is crossed by the rille system designated Rimae Boscovich that extends for a diameter of 32 kilometres. Two of these rilles lie at right angles to each other.

This crater is named after Croatian physicist Roger Joseph Boscovich (1711-1787). His name was introduced into lunar nomenclature during the 18th century by German astronomer Johann H. Schröter. Its designation was formally adopted by the International Astronomical Union in 1935.

== Satellite craters ==
By convention these features are identified on lunar maps by placing the letter on the side of the crater midpoint that is closest to Boscovich.

Boscovich	Latitude	Longitude	Diameter
A	9.5° N	12.6° E	6 km
B	9.8° N	9.2° E	5 km
C	8.5° N	12.0° E	3 km
D	9.0° N	12.2° E	5 km
E	9.0° N	12.7° E	21 km
F	10.6° N	11.4° E	5 km
P	11.5° N	10.3° E	67 km

== Gallery ==
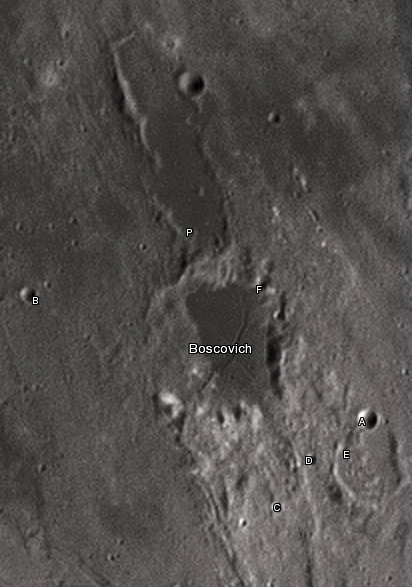
Boscovich crater and its satellite craters

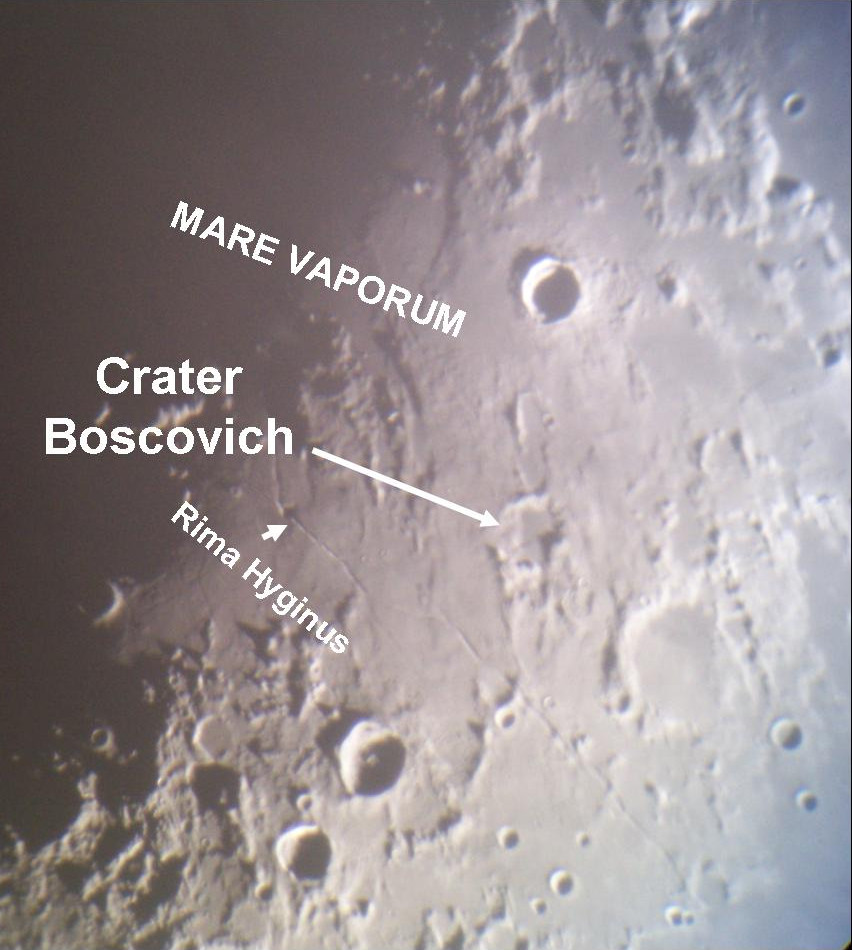
Location of the lunar crater Bošković

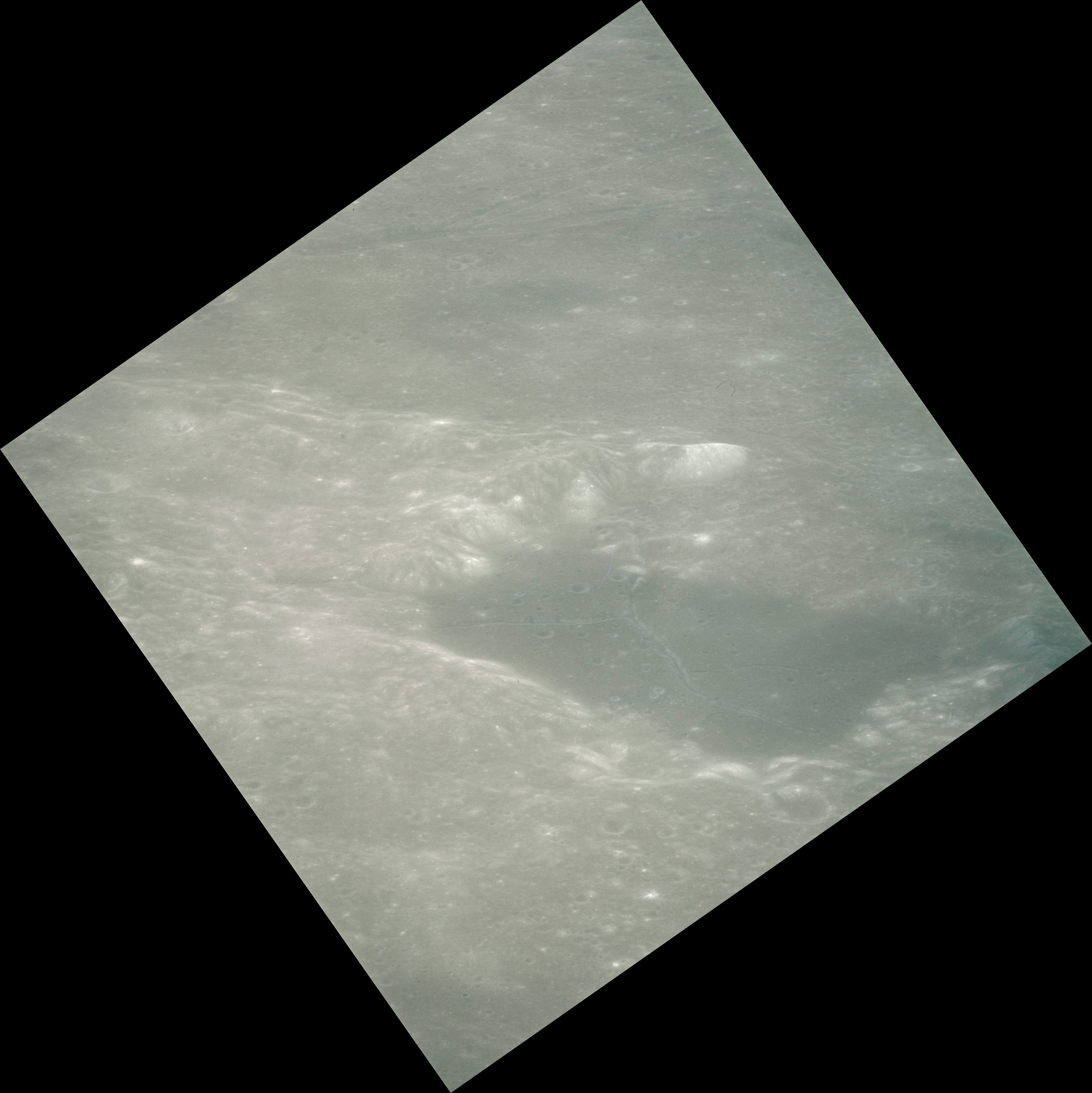
Oblique Apollo 15 image, looking south
