= Goran Bošković =

Goran Bošković may refer to:

- Goran Bošković (footballer, born 1966), Serbian football forward
- Goran Bošković (footballer, born 1976), Serbian football midfielder
- Goran Bošković (basketball) (born 1972), Montenegrin basketball coach and former player
