= Darko Bošković =

Serbian-born Montenegrin footballer

Personal information
- Full name: Darko Bošković
- Date of birth: 16 September 1987 (age 39)
- Place of birth: Sombor, SFR Yugoslavia
- Height: 1.75 m (5 ft 9 in)
- Position: Midfielder

Senior career*
Years	Team	Apps	(Gls)
2004–2008	Mladost Apatin	36	(1)
2005–2006	→ Big Bull Bačinci (loan)	20	(2)
2006–2007	→ Palić (loan)	30	(4)
2008–2010	Spartak Subotica	37	(0)
2011	Grbalj	7	(0)
2011	Timok	12	(1)
2012	Tatran Liptovský Mikuláš	7	(1)
2012–2015	Proleter Novi Sad	55	(5)
2015	Drina Zvornik	12	(0)
2015–2017	Mladost Doboj Kakanj	28	(1)
2017	Bačka Palanka	12	(0)
2017–2018	Odžaci		
2018	Vasalund	9	(2)
2019	IFK Stocksund	18	(1)
2020	Plavi Team	6	(5)
2021	Nacka Iliria	5	(0)

International career
2007	Montenegro U21	7	(0)
- * Club domestic league appearances and goals as of 26 April 2024

Darko Bošković (Serbian Cyrillic: Дарко Бошковић; born 16 September 1987) is a Serbian-born Montenegrin retired football midfielder.

== Club career ==
He started playing in 2004 for his hometown club FK Mladost Apatin. Being loaned to clubs like FK Big Bull Bačinci and FK Palić to gain experience, he did get to play two matches for Mladost in 2006–07 when the club competed in the SuperLiga. In the next seasons he stayed with the club in the Serbian First League, second tier, where he became an important player in the team. In December 2008, he moved to another First League club, FK Spartak Subotica, that ended being an excellent move since the club gained promotion to the Serbian SuperLiga where he played the 2009–10. In the following season he played the first half with Spartak, however during winter break he moved to OFK Grbalj playing in the Montenegrin First League. At summer 2011 he was back in Serbia this time to play with FK Timok. He later had a spell with OFK Odžaci in the Serbian League Vojvodina.

== International career ==
He is a former member of the Montenegro national under-21 football team.
