= Christopher Maire =

English Jesuit and astronomer

Christopher Maire (1697–1767) was an English Jesuit and writer on astronomy.

== Life ==
The son of Christopher Maire of Hartbushes, County Durham and his wife Frances Ingleby of Lawkland, Yorkshire, he was born on 6 March 1697, and studied humanities at St Omer College. He entered the Society of Jesus 7 September 1715, at Watten, and was professed of the four vows 2 February 1733. After a course of teaching at St Omer, and professing philosophy and theology at Liège, he was declared rector of the English College at Rome in the autumn of 1744, and he held that post until 1750. He returned to St Omer in March 1757; and died at Ghent on 22 February 1767.

== Works ==
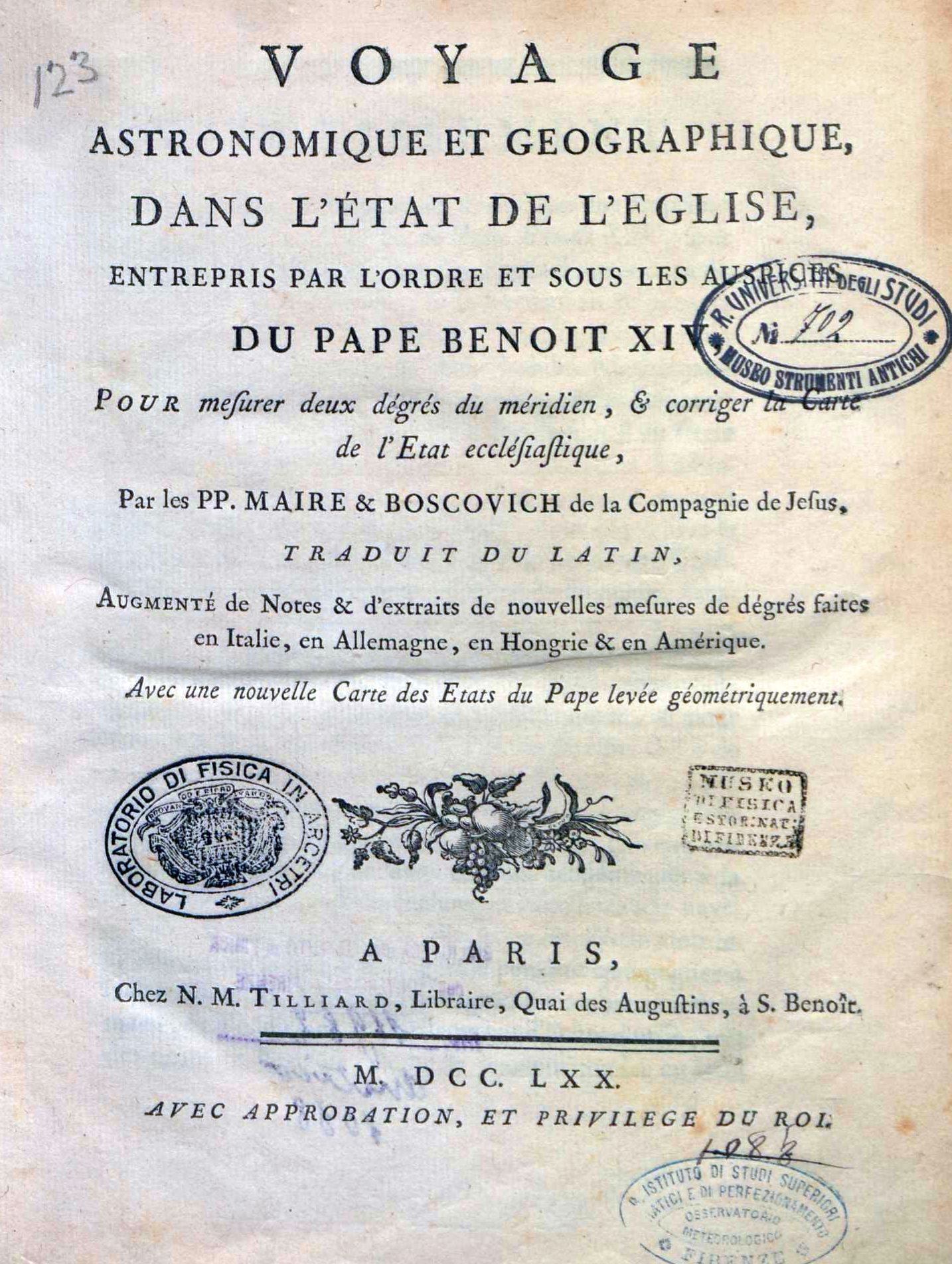
De litteraria expeditione per pontificiam ditionem ad dimetiendos duos meridiani gradus et corrigendam mappam geographicam, 1770

Maire's works are:

- Tractatus Theologicus de Sanctissima Trinitate, 1737, manuscript left in the library of the University of Liège.
- Observationes Cometæ ineunte anno mdccxliv in Collegio Anglicano Romæ habitæ, et cum theoria Newtoniana comparatæ, Rome, 1744. A translation into Italian also appeared.
- Observationes Astronomicæ Leodii, Audomarapoli, et Romæ habitæ ab anno 1727 ad 1743: in Carlo Antonio Giuliani's Memorie sopra la Fisica e Istoria Naturale di diversi Valentuomini, Lucca, 1744.
- Continuatio Observationum Astronomicarum P. C. Maire … quas Romæ habuit annis 1743 et 1744: in Giuliani's Memorie.
- Table of Longitudes and Latitudes for the principal Towns of the World: in Scientia Eclipsium, Rome, 1747.
- Defectus Solis observatus die 25 Julii in Collegio Anglicano: in Mémoires de Trévoux, September 1748.
- Observatio partialis Eclipsis Lunæ die 25 Decembris 1749 in Collegio Anglicano: in Francesco Antonio Zaccaria's Storia Letteraria d'Italia, xi. 375–7, and in the Giornale di Roma, 1749.
- Observations made at Rome of the Eclipse of the Moon, Dec. 23, 1749, and of that of the Sun, Jan. 8, 1750: in Philosophical Transactions x. 4 (1750).
- Osservazioni dell' ultimo passagio di Mercurio fatte in Roma, 1753: in the Giornali de' Letterati.
- De litteraria Expeditione per Pontificiam Ditionem ad dimetiendos duos Meridiani Gradus et corrigendam Mappam geographicam, jussu et auspiciis Benedicti XIV Pont. Max. suscepta a Patribus Societatis Jesu Christophoro Maire et Rogerio Josepho Boscovich, Rome, 1755. A French translation, with notes by Hugon, appeared at Paris in 1770. Also Nuova Carta Geographica dello Stato Ecclesiastico. Pope Benedict XIV had entrusted to Maire and Roger Boscovich the task of making a map of the Papal States.
- De litteraria expeditione per pontificiam ditionem ad dimetiendos duos meridiani gradus et corrigendam mappam geographicam (in Latin). Paris: Nicolas Martin Tilliard. 1770.
- Three letters in Stanislaus Wydra's Vita Josephi Stepling, Prague, 1779.

Alban Butler called Maire "an able mathematician", based on measurements he made of St Paul's Cathedral.

== See also ==
- Maire and Boscovich's arc measurement
