= Nemanja Bošković =

Serbian footballer (born 1990)

Personal information
- Date of birth: 8 May 1990 (age 36)
- Place of birth: Sivac, SFR Yugoslavia
- Height: 1.75 m (5 ft 9 in)
- Position: Midfielder

Youth career
- Hajduk Kula

Senior career*
| Years | Team | Apps | (Gls) |
| 2009–2012 | Hajduk Kula | 31 | (1) |
| 2005–2006 | → Crvenka (loan) | 14 | (2) |
| 2007–2008 | → Radnički Sombor (loan) | 23 | (0) |
| 2008–2009 | → Mladost Apatin (loan) | 11 | (0) |
| 2011 | → Bačka Topola (loan) | 8 | (0) |
| 2013 | Radnički Sombor | 11 | (1) |
| 2013–2014 | Senta | 23 | (0) |
| 2014–2016 | Proleter Novi Sad | 27 | (2) |
| 2016–2017 | Slavija Sarajevo | 11 | (0) |
| 2017 | Proleter Novi Sad | 10 | (0) |
| 2017 | Radnički Sombor | | |
| 2018 | Vasalund IF | 11 | (1) |
| 2018–2020 | Radnički Sombor | | |
| 2020–2021 | Mladost Novi Sad | | |
- * Club domestic league appearances and goals as of 17 May 2017

Nemanja Bošković (Serbian Cyrillic: Немања Бошковић; born 8 May 1990) is a Serbian footballer.

Bošković spent half a season in Sweden with Vasalund IF.
