= Momčilo Bošković =

Montenegrin footballer

Personal information
- Full name: Momčilo Bošković
- Date of birth: 6 October 1954 (age 72)
- Place of birth: SFR Yugoslavia
- Height: 1.75 m (5 ft 9 in)
- Position: Midfielder

Senior career*
Years	Team	Apps	(Gls)
1969–1970	Vojvodina	1	(0)
1970–1971	Hajduk Kula		
1971–1975	Vojvodina	79	(0)
1975–1976	Vrbas	32	(2)
1976–1977	Vojvodina	2	(0)
1977–1978	Budućnost Titograd	10	(0)
1978–1979	Radnički Pirot	22	(0)
1979–1980	Panachaiki	20	(0)
1983–1984	Sporting Lisbon	0	(0)
- * Club domestic league appearances and goals

Momčilo Bošković (born 6 October 1954) is a retired footballer who played as a midfielder for club sides in Yugoslavia, Greece and Portugal.

== Club career ==
Bošković began playing football with FK Vojvodina and would spend most of his career in the Yugoslav First League with the club. He also had spells with FK Hajduk Kula, FK Vrbas, FK Budućnost Podgorica and FK Radnički Pirot.

Bošković moved to Greece in July 1979, joining Greek first division side Panachaiki Late in his career, he joined Sporting Clube de Portugal, but did not play in any matches with the first team.
