= Bosco Tjan =

Chinese-American psychologist (1966–2016)

Siaufung "Bosco" Tjan (曾学锋, January 21, 1966 – December 2, 2016) was a Chinese-American psychologist and neuroscientist. He was a professor of psychology at the University of Southern California's Dornsife College of Letters, Arts & Sciences.

== Education ==
Born in Beijing, China to Indonesian-born parents, Tjan moved from Hong Kong to the United States as a teenager. He received his bachelor's degree in computer science from the University of Kansas in 1987 and his Ph.D. in computer and information science from the University of Minnesota in 1997. His PhD thesis was entitled "Ideal Observer Analysis of Object Recognition".

== Career ==
From 1990 to 1996, Tjan worked as a research assistant at the University of Minnesota. He joined the University of Southern California (USC) as an assistant professor in the psychology department in 2001. He was promoted to associate professor there in 2008 and to full professor in 2015.

At USC, he co-founded the Dornsife Cognitive Neuroscience Imaging Center, and served as its co-director at the time of his death. He directed the Laboratory for Functional and Computational Vision at USC.

He also served in the Research Grants Council of Hong Kong from 2008 to 2014.

== Research interests ==
Tjan was known for researching the responses people have to vision loss caused by multiple conditions, such as macular degeneration. A page on the USC website stated that his research objective was to study the "human visual system to address basic and translational questions pertaining to vision loss, restoration, and rehabilitation.”

== Death ==
On December 2, 2016, Tjan was fatally stabbed by a USC student; soon afterward, one of his graduate students was arrested on suspicion of having carried out the stabbing. His body was found inside the Seeley G. Mudd Building, where he worked, after which he was pronounced dead. Tjan was 50 years old.

Authorities reportedly believe a student killed Tjan as the result of a personal dispute, but police have not yet established a motive.

Los Angeles Superior Court Judge Leslie A. Swain ruled on January 30, 2018, that former graduate student David Jonathan Brown was not guilty by reason of insanity for the first-degree murder of USC professor Bosco Tjan, according to the L.A. County District Attorney's office.
