= Maja Bošković-Stulli =

Croatian slavicist & folklorist (1922–2012)

- Born: 9 November 1922; Osijek, Kingdom of Serbs, Croats and Slovenes
- Died: 14 August 2012 (aged 89); Zagreb, Croatia
- Education: University of Zagreb
- Occupations: Folklorist, writer
- Parents: Dragutin Bošković; Ivanka Szarvas
- Relatives: Magda Bošković (sister)

Maja Bošković-Stulli (9 November 1922 – 14 August 2012) was a Croatian slavicist and folklorist, literary historian, writer, publisher and an academic, noted for her extensive research of Croatian oral literature.

== Early life ==
Maja Bošković-Stulli with older sister Magda prior World War II.

Bošković-Stulli was born in Osijek to a Jewish family of Dragutin and Ivanka Bošković. She joined the Young Communist League of Yugoslavia – SKOJ (from Serbo-Croatian: Savez komunističke omladine Jugoslavije) during Gymnasium education. In 1943, after the capitulation of Italy and liberation of the Rab concentration camp, she joined the Partisans. Many members of her family perished during the Holocaust, including her parents and sister Magda.

== Education and later years ==
Bošković-Stulli finished elementary and secondary school in Zagreb. She graduated from the Faculty of Philosophy in Zagreb and received her PhD in 1961. She took part in many national and international conferences and symposiums, including the Inter-University Centre in Dubrovnik. For many years she was chief editor, and afterwards a regular member, of the editorial board for the journal Narodna umjetnost. She worked at the Croatian Academy of Sciences and Arts, and from 1952 until her retirement in 1979 she worked at the Institute of Ethnology and Folklore Research in Zagreb. From 1963-73 she was the Director of the Institute.

Bošković-Stulli wrote around twenty books and a large number of papers in national and international academic journals. She has received a number of awards for her research work, the annual award in 1975 and the Croatian lifework award in 1990, the Herder Prize in Vienna 1991, and Pitrè - Salomone Marino prize in Palermo 1992. She was a regular member at the Croatian Academy of Sciences and Arts.

In 2005 Bošković-Stulli was named among 35 Croatia's most important women in history. Bošković-Stulli died on 14 August 2012 in Zagreb and was buried at the Mirogoj Cemetery.

== Works ==
- Istarske narodne priče, Zagreb 1959
- Narodne pripovijetke ("Pet stoljeća hrvatske književnosti"), Zagreb 1963
- Narodne epske pjesme, knj. 2 ("Pet stoljeća hrvatske književnosti"), Zagreb 1964
- Narodna predaja o vladarevoj tajni, Zagreb 1967
- Usmena književnost ("Povijest hrvatske književnosti" 1, pp. 7–353), Zagreb 1978
- Usmena književnost nekad i danas, Beograd 1983
- Usmeno pjesništvo u obzorju književnosti, Zagreb 1984;
- Zakopano zlato. Hrvatske usmene pripovijetke, predaje i legende iz Istre, Pula – Rijeka 1986
- U kralja od Norina. Priče, pjesme, zagonetke i poslovice s Neretve, Metković – Opuzen 1987
- Pjesme, priče, fantastika, Zagreb 1991;
- Žito posred mora. Usmene priče iz Dalmacije, Split 1993
- Priče i pričanje: stoljeća usmene hrvatske proze, Zagreb 1997
- Usmene pripovijetke i predaje ("Stoljeća hrvatske književnosti"), Zagreb 1997
- O usmenoj tradiciji i o životu, Zagreb 1999
