= Boško Čvorkov =

Serbian footballer

Personal information
- Full name: Boško Čvorkov
- Date of birth: 14 June 1978 (age 48)
- Place of birth: Ruma, SFR Yugoslavia
- Height: 1.76 m (5 ft 9 1/2 in)
- Position: Midfielder

Senior career*
Years	Team	Apps	(Gls)
1996–1998	Sloven Ruma	43	(4)
1998–2002	Zemun	74	(3)
2002–2003	Železnik	7	(0)
2003–2004	Zemun	11	(0)
2004–2005	SC Untersiebenbrunn		
2005–2009	Zemun	44	(8)
2009–2010	Kolubara	21	(1)
2010–2011	Zemun	1	(0)
- * Club domestic league appearances and goals

Boško Čvorkov (Serbian Cyrillic: Бошко Чворков; born 14 June 1978) is a Serbian footballer.

== External sources ==
- Profile and stats at Srbijafudbal
- Old stats at Dekisa.Tripod
