= Roger Joseph Boscovich =

Croat-Italian physicist and writer (1711–1787)

The Reverend Roger Joseph Boscovich SJ FRS
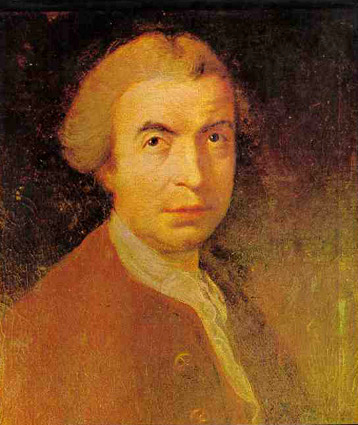
- Portrait by Robert Edge Pine, London, 1760
- Born: Ruđer Josip Bošković; 18 May 1711; Dubrovnik, Republic of Ragusa (modern Croatia)
- Died: 13 February 1787 (aged 75); Milan, Duchy of Milan (modern Italy)
- Citizenship: Republic of Ragusa
- Education: Collegio Romano
- Known for: Precursor of the atomic theory Founder of Brera Observatory
- Awards: ForMemRS (1761)
- Scientific career
- Fields: Theology, physics, astronomy, mathematics, natural philosophy, diplomacy, poetry
- Workplaces: Brera Observatory; University of Pavia

Signature
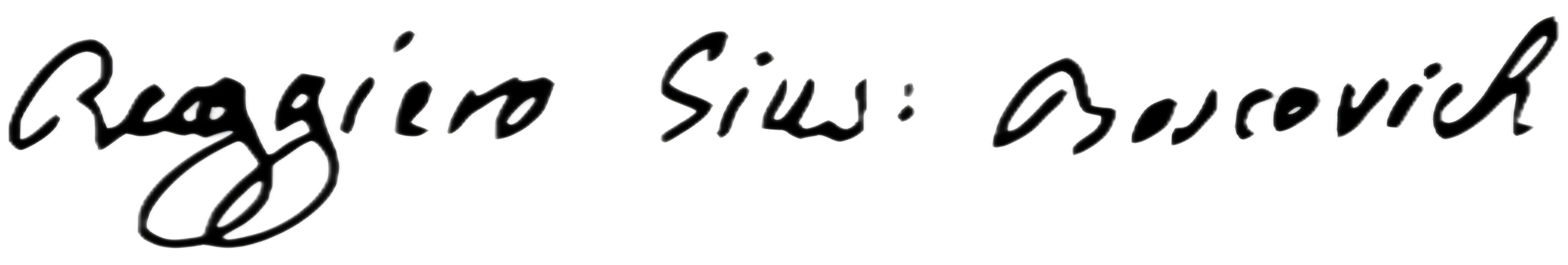

Roger Joseph Boscovich (Note: Croatian: Ruđer Josip Bošković, pronounced [rûd͡ʑer jǒsip bôʃkoʋit͡ɕ] Italian: Ruggiero Giuseppe Boscovich Latin: Rogerius (Iosephus) Boscovicius) SJ (18 May 1711 – 13 February 1787) was a physicist, astronomer, mathematician, philosopher, diplomat, poet, theologian, Jesuit priest, and a polymath from the Republic of Ragusa. He studied and lived in Italy and France where he also published many of his works.

Boscovich produced a precursor of atomic theory and made many contributions to astronomy, including the first geometric procedure for determining the equator of a rotating planet from three observations of a surface feature and for computing the orbit of a planet from three observations of its position. In 1753 he also discovered the absence of an atmosphere on the Moon.

== Biography ==
=== Early years ===
Boscovich was born on 18 May 1711 in Dubrovnik, Republic of Ragusa, to Paola Bettera (1674–1777), daughter of a local nobleman of Italian origin, and Nikola Bošković, a Ragusan merchant. Boscovich's father was an ethnic Croat (some sources say Serb). He was baptised on 26 May 1711 by Marinus Carolis, curatus et sacristia. The name Ruđer/Ruggiero may have been given to him because both his maternal great-grandfather, Agostino Bettera, and his mother's brother were called Ruggiero; his godfather was his uncle, Ruggiero Bettera. He was the seventh child of the family and the second youngest. His father was born in the village of Orahov Do near Ravno, at the time part of the Ottoman Empire (now Bosnia and Herzegovina).

His uncle, Don Ilija Bošković, was killed by Uskok bandits while celebrating Mass in 1692. While his father, Nikola, had once been a prolific trader who traveled through the Ottoman Empire, Ruđer only knew him as a bedridden invalid; he died when his son was 10 years old. Boscovich's mother Paola, nicknamed "Pavica", was a member of a cultivated Italian merchant family established in Dubrovnik in the early 17th century, when her ancestor, Pietro Bettera, settled from Bergamo in northern Italy. She was described as a robust and active woman with a happy temperament who lived to 103.

Paola Bettera Bošković left nothing in writing but her sister wrote poetry in Italian. Ruđer's cousins and playmates, Antun Bošković and Franjo Bošković, grew up into good Latinists. His brothers and sisters were all older than himself, except his sister Anica Bošković (1714–1804), two years his junior. His eldest sister, Mare Bošković, nineteen years his senior, was the only member of the family to marry. His second sister, Marija Bošković, became a nun in the Ragusa Convent of St Catherine. His eldest brother, Božo Bošković (Boško, called Natale by Roger in private correspondence), thirteen years older, joined the service of the Ragusa Republic. Another brother, Bartolomej Bošković, born in 1700 and educated at the Jesuit school in Dubrovnik, left home when Ruđer was 3 to become a scholar and a Jesuit priest in Rome. He also wrote verse in both Latin and "Illyrian" (the Renaissance era name for Serbo-Croatian), but eventually burnt some of his manuscripts out of a scrupulous modesty. Another brother, Ivan (Đivo) Bošković, became a Dominican in a sixteenth-century monastery in Dubrovnik, whose church Ruđer knew as a child with its rich treasures and paintings by Titian and Vasari, still there today. Another brother, Petar (Pero) Bošković, six years his senior, became a poet like his grandfather. He was schooled by the Jesuits, then served as an official of the Republic and made his reputation as a translator of Ovid, Corneille's Cid, and of Molière. A volume of his religious verse, Hvale Duhovne, was published in Venice in 1729.

At the age of 8 or 9, after acquiring the rudiments of reading and writing from Father Nicola Nicchei of the Church of St Nicholas, Ruđer was sent for schooling to the local Jesuit Collegium Ragusinum. During his early studies, Boscovich showed a distinct propensity for further intellectual development. He gained a reputation at school for having an easy memory and a quick, deep mind.

On 16 September 1725, Ruđer Bošković left Dubrovnik for Rome. He was in the care of two Jesuit priests who took him to the Society of Jesus, famous for its education of youth and at that time having some 800 establishments and 200,000 pupils under its care throughout the world. We learn nothing from Bošković himself until the time he entered the novitiate in 1731, but it was the usual practice for novices to spend the first two years not in the Collegium Romanum but in Sant'Andrea delle Fratte. There, he studied mathematics and physics; and so quick was his progress in these sciences that in 1740 he was appointed professor of mathematics in the college.

He was especially appropriate for this post due to his acquaintance with recent advances in science, and his skill in a classical severity of demonstration, acquired by a thorough study of the works of the Greek geometers. Several years before this appointment he had made a name for himself with a solution of the problem of finding the Sun's equator and determining the period of its rotation by observation of the spots on its surface.

=== Middle years ===
Notwithstanding the arduous duties of his professorship, he found time for investigation in various fields of physical science, and he published a very large number of dissertations, some of them of considerable length. Among the subjects were the transit of Mercury, the Aurora Borealis, the figure of the Earth, the observation of the fixed stars, the inequalities in terrestrial gravitation, the application of mathematics to the theory of the telescope, the limits of certainty in astronomical observations, the solid of greatest attraction, the cycloid, the logistic curve, the theory of comets, the tides, the law of continuity, the double refraction micrometer, and various problems of spherical trigonometry.

In 1742, he was consulted, with other men of science, by Pope Benedict XIV, as to the best means of securing the stability of the dome of St. Peter's, Rome, in which a crack had been discovered. His suggestion of placing five concentric iron bands was adopted.

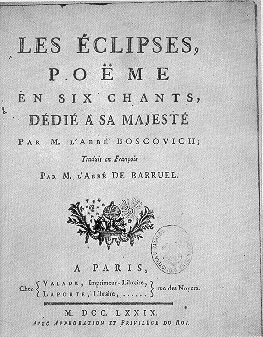
French translation of Bošković's De solis ac lunae defectibus

In 1744, he was ordained to the Roman Catholic priesthood.

In 1745, Bošković published De Viribus Vivis in which he tried to find a middle way between Isaac Newton's gravitational theory and Gottfried Leibniz's metaphysical theory of monad-points. He developed a concept of "impenetrability" as a property of hard bodies which explained their behaviour in terms of force rather than matter. Stripping atoms of their matter, impenetrability is disassociated from hardness and then put in an arbitrary relationship to elasticity. Impenetrability has a Cartesian sense that more than one point cannot occupy the same location at once.

Bošković visited his hometown only once, in 1747, never to return. He agreed to take part in the Portuguese expedition for the survey of Brazil and the arc measurement of a degree of latitude (meridian arc), but was persuaded by the Pope to stay in Italy and to undertake a similar task there with Christopher Maire, an English Jesuit who measured an arc of two degrees between Rome and Rimini. The operation began at the end of 1750, and was completed in about two years. An account was published in 1755, under the name De Litteraria expeditione per pontificiam ditionem ad dimetiendos duos meridiani gradus a PP. Maire et Boscovicli. The value of this work was increased by a carefully prepared map of the States of the Church. A French translation appeared in 1770 which incorporated, as an appendix, some material first published in 1760 outlining an objective procedure for determining suitable values for the parameters of the fitted model from a greater number of observations. An unconstrained variant of this fitting procedure is now known as the L1-norm or Least absolute deviations procedure and serves as a robust alternative to the familiar L2-norm or Least Squares procedure.

A dispute arose between Francis the Grand Duke of Tuscany and the Republic of Lucca with respect to the drainage of a lake. As an agent of Lucca, Bošković was sent, in 1757, to Vienna and succeeded in bringing about a satisfactory arrangement in the matter. Here he met Karl Scherffer who became an influential promoter of the ideas of Bošković in Austria.

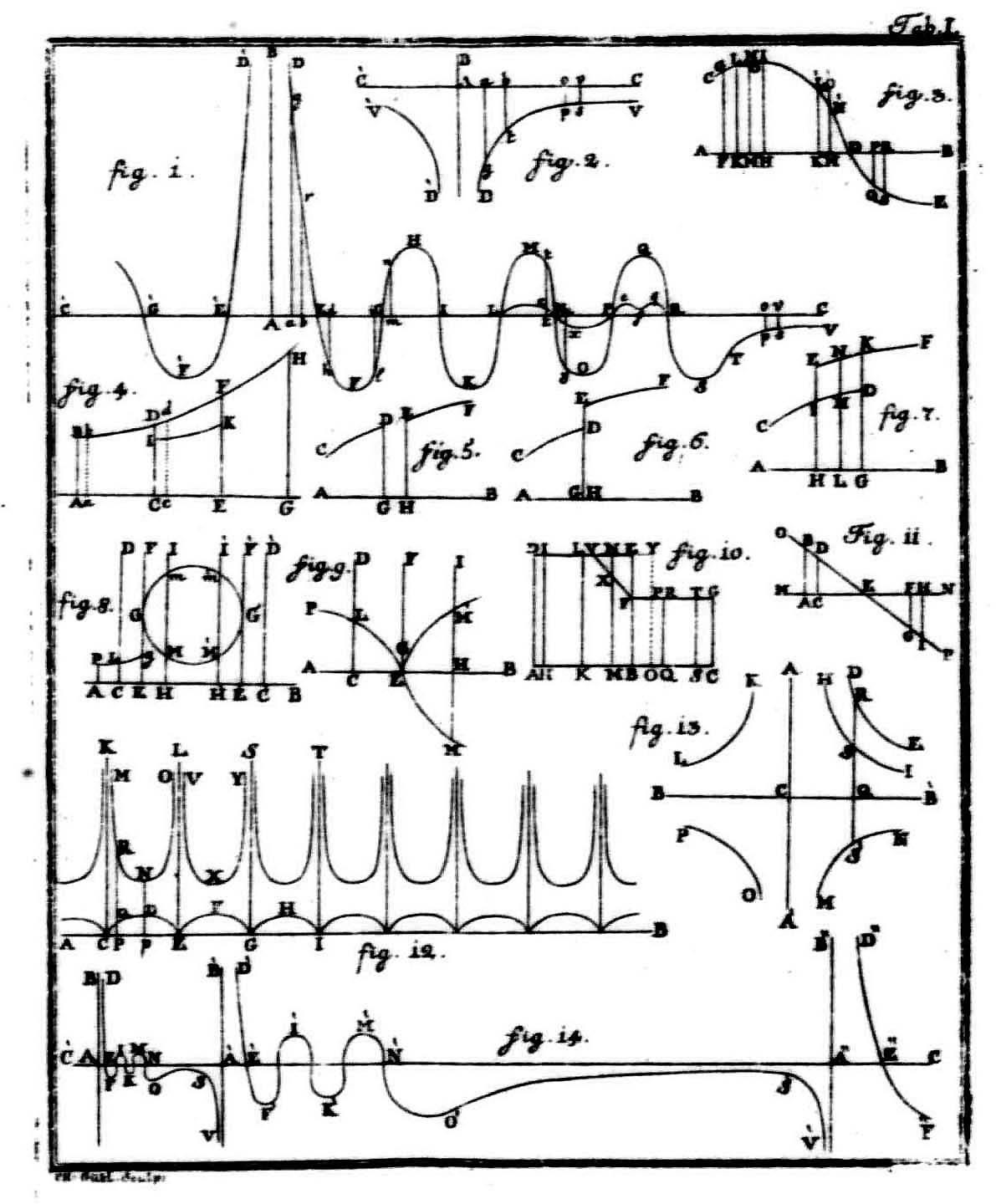
The first page of figures from Theoria Philosophiæ Naturalis from 1763. Figure 1 is the force curve which received so much attention from later natural philosophers such as Joseph Priestley, Humphry Davy, and Michael Faraday. The ordinate is force, with positive values being repulsive, and the abscissa is radial distance. Newton's gravitational attractive force is clearly seen at the far right of figure 1.

In Vienna in 1758, he published the first edition of his famous work, Philosophiæ naturalis theoria redacta ad unicam legem virium in natura existentium (Theory of Natural philosophy derived to the single Law of forces which exist in Nature), containing his atomic theory and his theory of forces.

A second edition was published in 1763 in Venice and a third again in Vienna in 1764. In 1922, it was published in London, and in 1966, in the United States. Another edition was published in Zagreb in 1974.

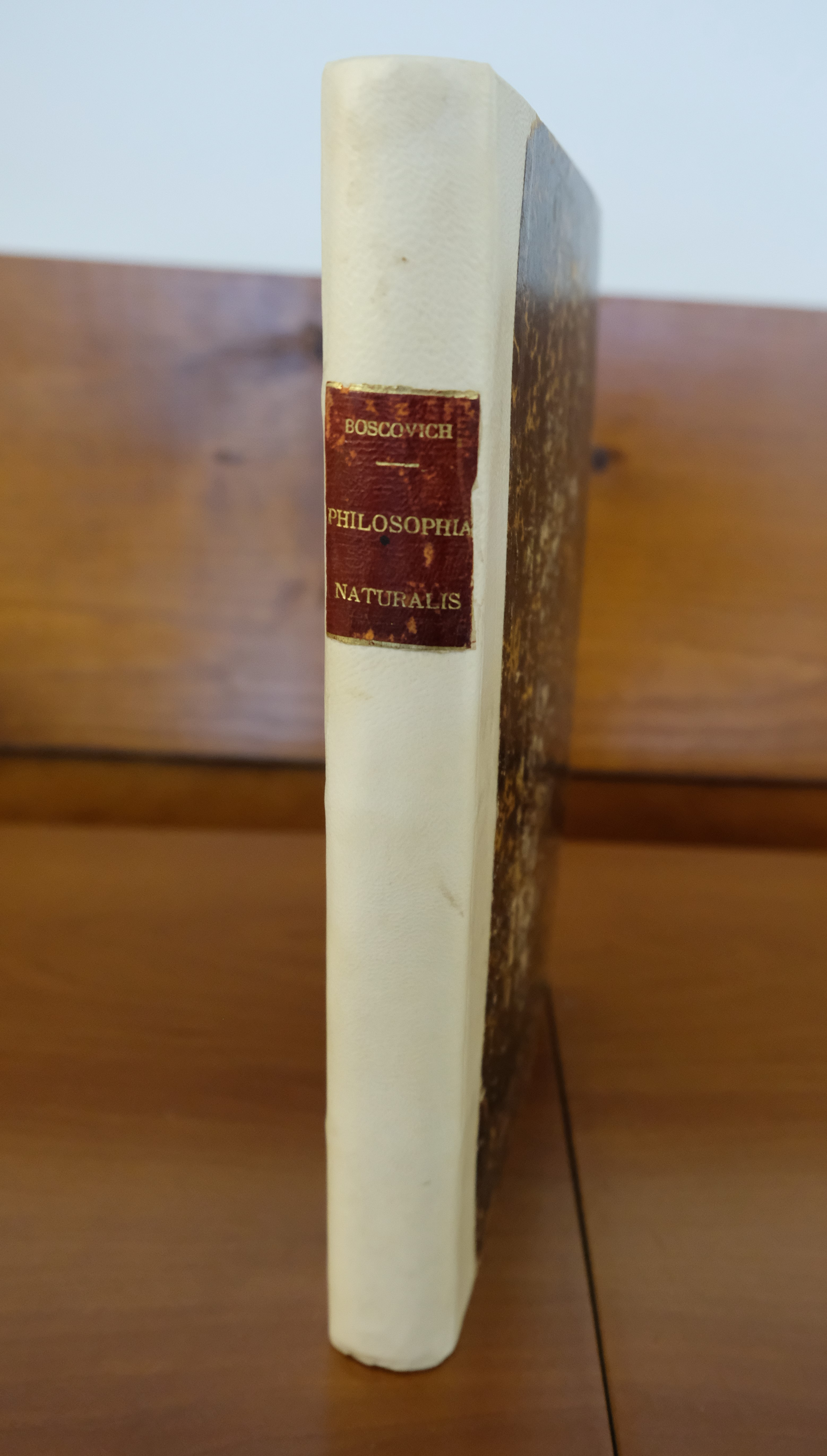
Outside of a 1763 copy of Boscovich's "Theoria philosophiae naturalis, redacta ad unicam legem virium in natura existentium"

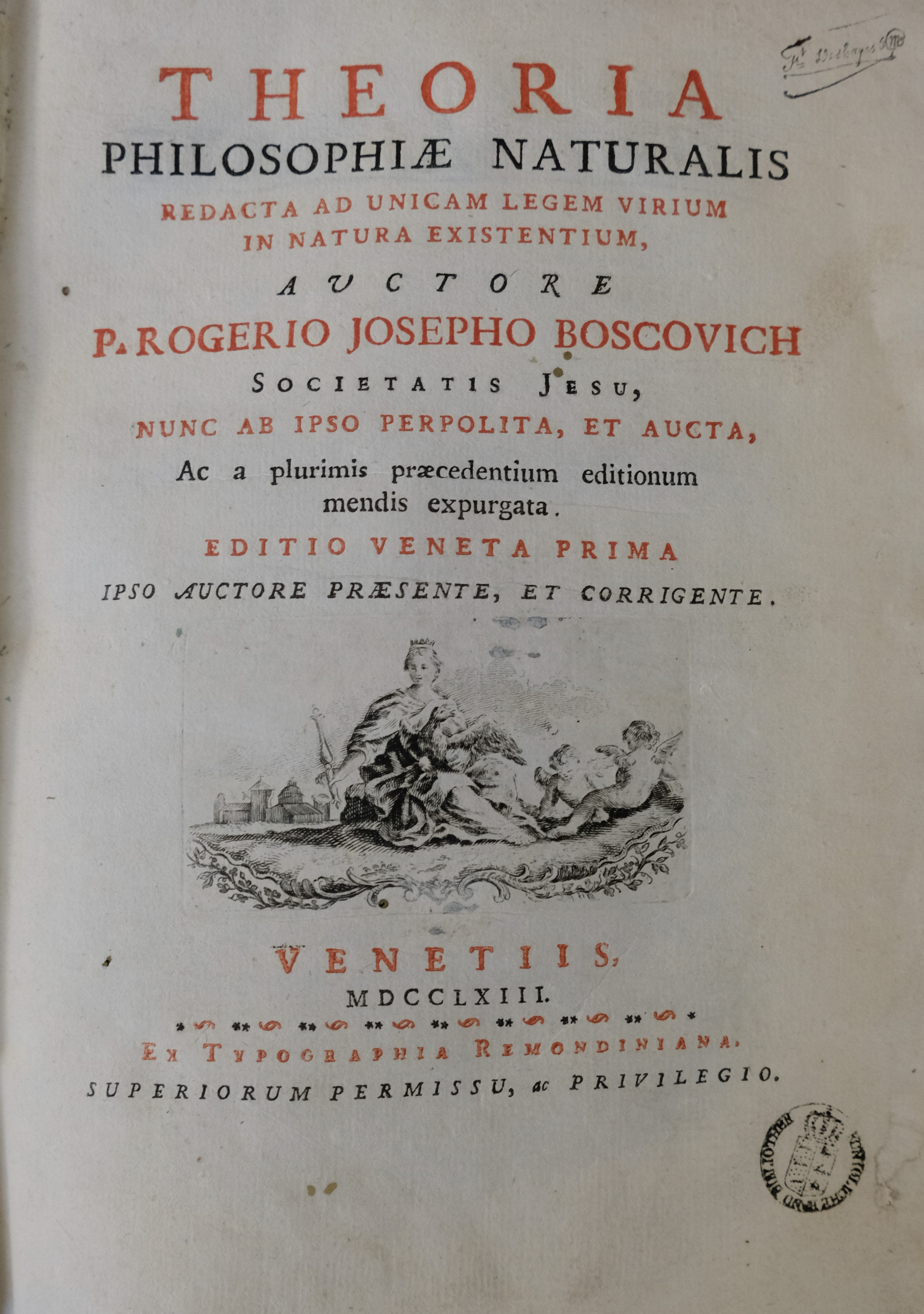
Opening page "Theoria philosophiae naturalis"

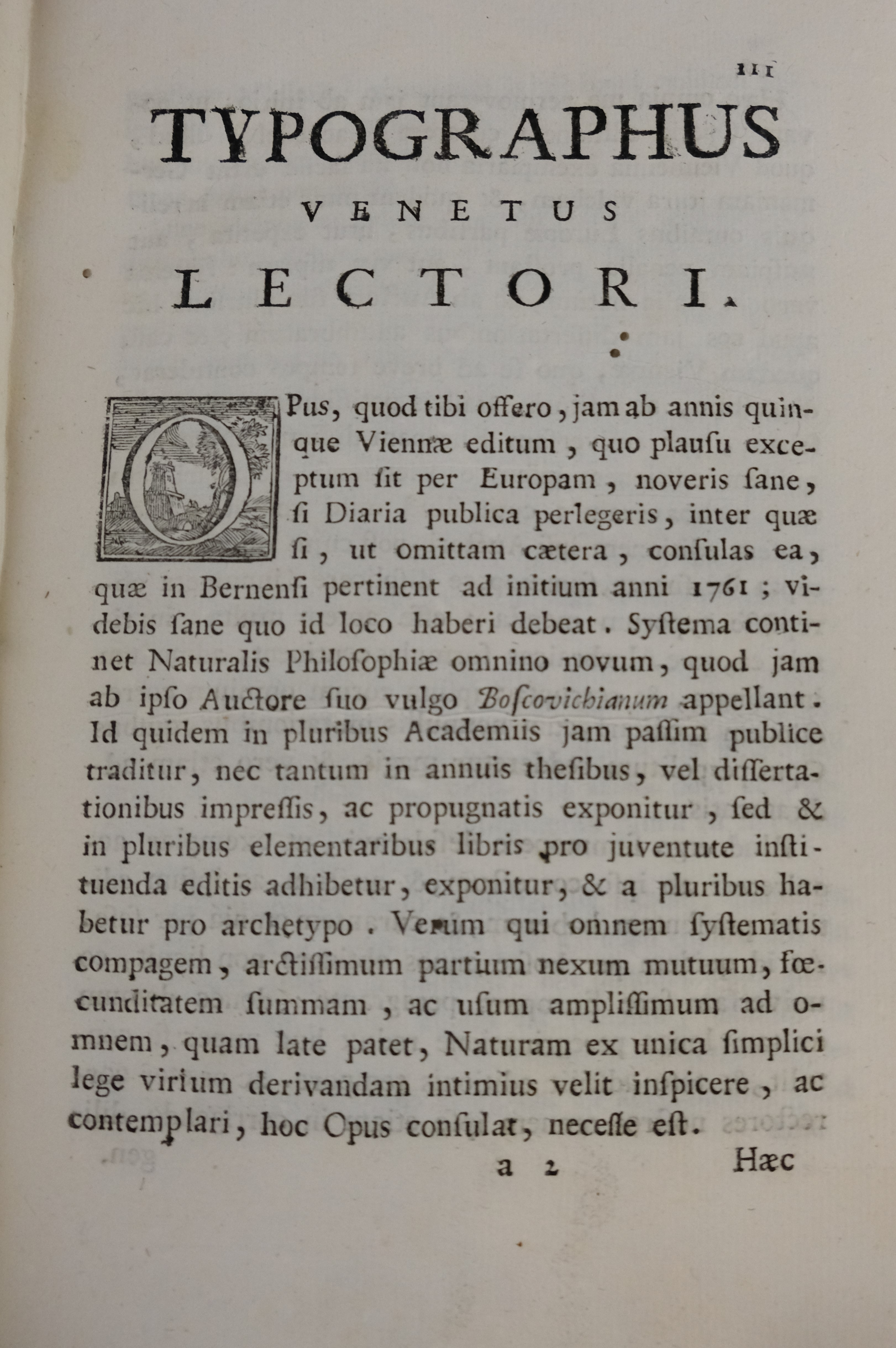
First page of "Theoria philosophiae naturalis"

Another occasion to exercise his diplomatic ability soon arose. The British government suspected that warships had been fitted out in Dubrovnik for the service of France, and that therefore the neutrality of the republic had been violated. Bošković was selected to undertake an ambassadorship to London in 1760, to convince the British that nothing of the sort had occurred and provide proof of Ragusa's neutrality. This mission proved to be a complete success – a credit to him and a delight to his countrymen. During his stay in England, he was elected as a fellow of the Royal Society.

In 1761, astronomers were preparing to observe the transit of Venus across the Sun. Under the influence of the Royal Society, Bošković decided to travel to Constantinople. He arrived late and then travelled to Poland via Bulgaria and Moldavia then proceeding to Saint Petersburg where he was elected as a member of Russian Academy of Sciences. Ill health compelled him soon to return to Italy.

Bošković visited Laibach, the capital of Carniola (now Ljubljana, Slovenia), at least in 1757, 1758, and 1763, and made contact with the Jesuits and the Franciscan friars in the town. The Jesuits incorporated his teachings into their lectures at the Laibach Jesuit College. His physics became the foundation of physical lectures as well in other parts of the Habsburg monarchy, and influenced the thought of, among others, Gabriel Gruber and Jurij Vega, prominent physicists of the period. Both Vega and the Rationalist philosopher Franz Samuel Karpe educated their students in Vienna about the ideas of Bošković and in the spirit of his thought.

=== Late years ===
In 1764, he was called to serve as the chair of mathematics at the University of Pavia, and for six years he held this post with the directorship of the observatory of Brera in Milan, That is where Charles Burney met him; since Burney's Italian was not very good at that time, Boscovich obliged him speaking French.

He was invited by the Royal Society of London to undertake an expedition to California to observe the transit of Venus in 1769 again, but this was prevented by the recent decree of the Spanish government expelling Jesuits from its dominions. Bošković had many enemies and he was driven to frequent changes of residence. About 1777, he returned to Milan, where he continued to teach and direct the Brera observatory.

Deprived of his post by the intrigues of his associates, he was about to retire to Dubrovnik when in 1773, the news of the suppression of his order in Italy reached him. Uncertainty led him to accept an invitation from the King of France to come to Paris where he was appointed director of optics for the navy, with a pension of 8,000 livres and a position was created for him. In France, Boscovich was elected a member of the Academy of Sciences in Paris, Metz and Marseille. He naturalised in France and stayed for ten years, but his position became irksome, and at length intolerable. He, however, continued to work in the pursuit of scientific knowledge and published many remarkable works. Among them was an elegant solution to the problem of determining the orbit of a comet from three observations, and works on micrometer and achromatic telescopes.

In 1782, Bošković was one of the founders of the Accademia nazionale delle scienze detta dei XL (National Association of the Sciences), with the name of "Società Italiana" (Italian Association): this learned society gathered forty members representing the most important Italian scientists of the period.

In 1783, he returned to Italy and spent two years at Bassano, occupying himself with the publication of his Opera pertinentia ad opticam et astronomiam, etc., published in 1785 in five volumes quarto.

After a visit of some months to the convent of Vallombrosa, he went to Brera in 1786 and resumed his work. At that time his health was failing, his reputation was on the wane, his works did not sell, and he gradually fell prey to illness and disappointment. He died in Milan and was buried in the church of St. Maria Podone.

=== Boscovich's demon ===
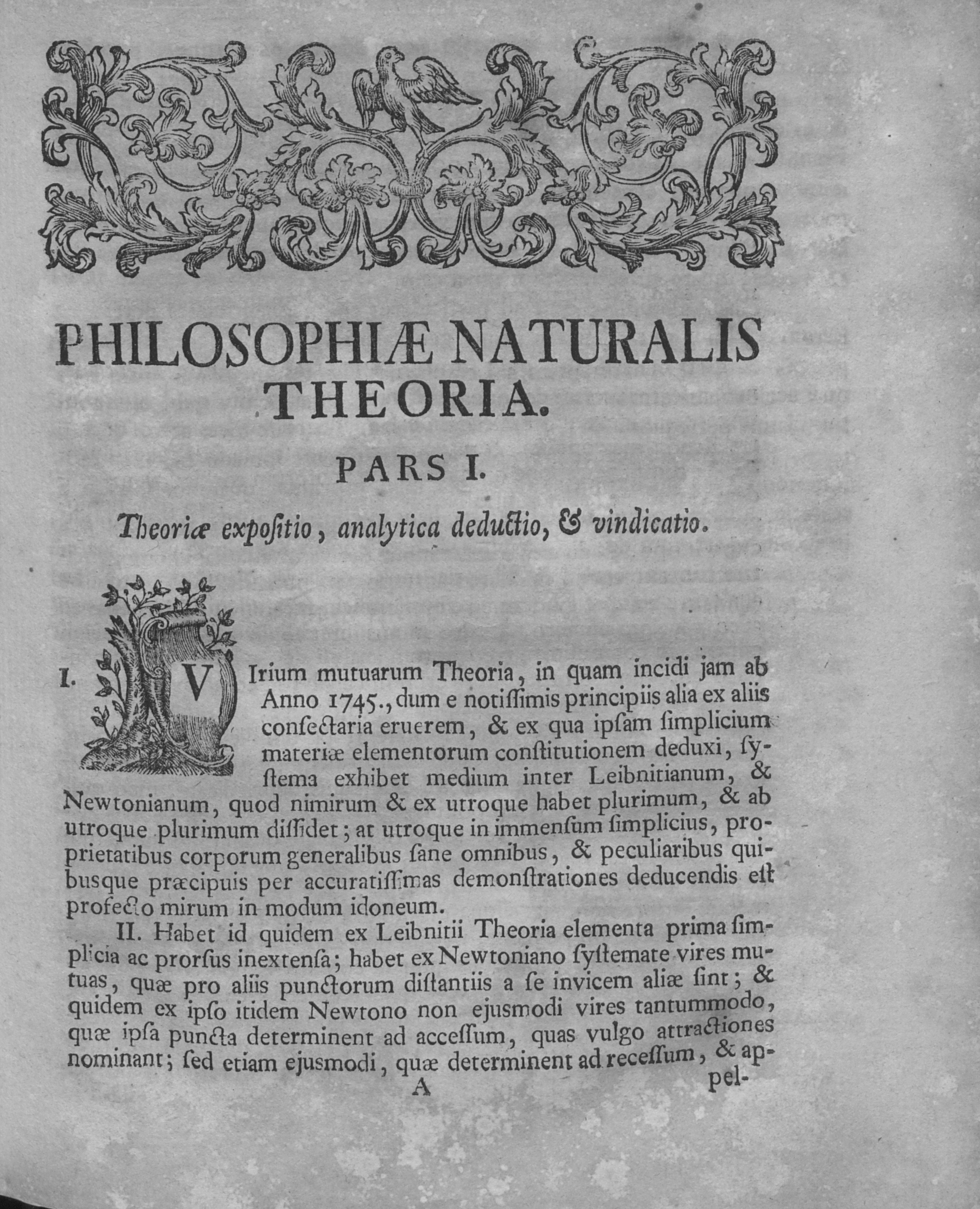
Philosophiae naturalis theoria (1758)

In philosophy and physics, Laplace's demon is a thought experiment supporting the concept of determinism. It suggests that if someone (the Demon) knew the precise location and momentum of every particle in the universe, he could in principle calculate the history and future of every particle.

While Laplace's version of determinism is based on general terms, Boscovich's uses physical terms, like position, velocity, direction and centre of mass. Boscovich also (correctly) suggests that the continuity of force is a necessary assumption for determinism, and he presented it in strict mathematical form. In short, Boskovich's determinism is more physical, while Laplace's determinism is more metaphysical, placing it in harmony with Leibniz's metaphysics.

Knowing with complete accuracy both the location and velocity of a particle violates the uncertainty principle of modern quantum mechanics, so this is no longer considered physically possible.

== Further works ==
In addition to the works already mentioned Bošković published course material he had prepared for his pupils in mathematics. He also published accounts of his travels from Constantinople to Poland, in several expanded editions and translated into French.

Bošković applied himself to practical engineering projects, including several discussions of architectural repair or stability, including repairs to St Peter's Dome, the stability of the Duomo of Milan, repairs to the library of Cesarea di Vienna, and a report on the damage to sectors of Rome in June 1749 due to a whirlwind.

Bošković was also consulted on civil works concerning ports and rivers: Ivica Martinovic has shown the extent to which Bošković applied himself to such works, and lists 13 major works:

- assessment of damage to the timber jetties in the Fiumicino, the navigable branch of the River Tiber (1751);
- the Ozzeri project, spurred by a bitter controversy on the floods in the border area between Lucca and Tuscany (1756);
- plan for the drainage of the Pontine Marshes, including the evaluation of an earlier project by Manfredi and Bertaglia (1764);
- analysis of the causes of damage to the port of Rimini, accompanied by reparation measures (1764);
- assessment of the levees along the River Po (1764);
- scientific letter on the principles of hydrodynamics in Lecchi's Idrostatica (1765);
- report on the floods in the Perugia area (1766);
- official report on the damage to the port of Savona, the underlying causes and the possibilities of repair (1771);
- expert opinion referring to the River Tidone in the Piacenza area (1771);
- proposal for the renovation of the fountains in Perugia (1772);
- expert opinion on the mouth of the River Adige as compared with the proposals by Antonio Lorgna and Simun Stratik for the improvement of the river bed (1773);
- instructions for the establishment of a team responsible for the drainage of the Pontine Marshes (1774);
- comments on Ximenes's project for the Nuovo Ozzeri drainage channel in Lucca (1781).

Martinovic's paper includes an extensive annotated bibliography on such works.

== Religious views ==
Bošković was a Roman Catholic priest, and in expressing his religious views was straightforward. In his most famous book A Theory of Natural Philosophy (1758) he says: "Regarding the nature of the Divine Creator, my theory is extraordinarily illuminating, and the result from it is a necessity to recognize Him. ... Therefore vain dreams of those who believe that the world was created by accident, or that it could be built as a fatal necessity, or that it was there for eternity lining itself along his own necessary laws are completely eliminated."

Bošković also composed poetry with many religious and astronomical allusions. In his Marian devotion, he wrote hexameter verses on the Virgin Mary.

In the same dome of St. Peter in Rome, whose cupola he saved from ruin, he worked as a confessor administering the Sacrament of Penance or Reconciliation.

== Legacy ==
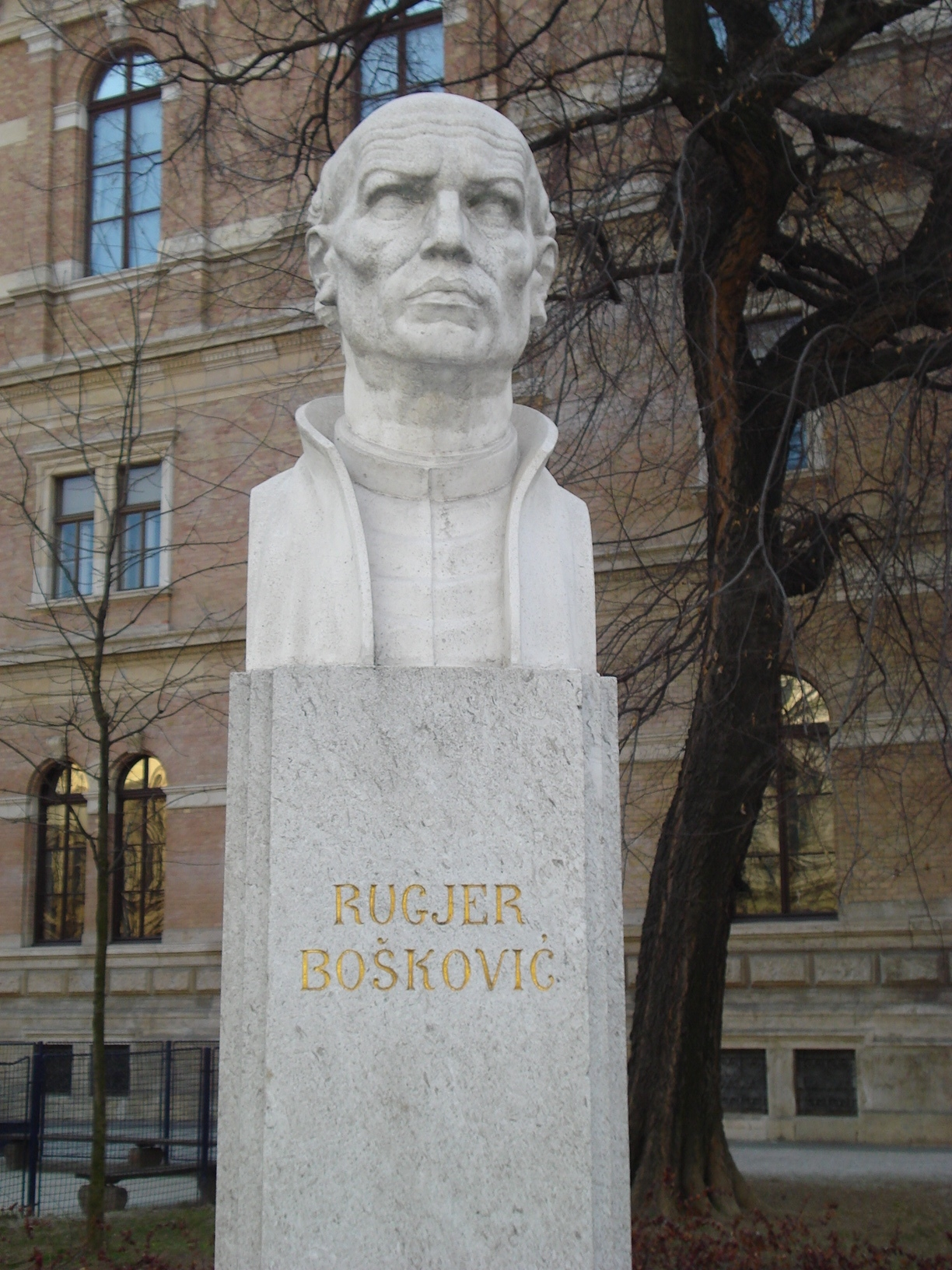
Ruđer Bošković bust in front of the Croatian Academy of Sciences and Arts building in Zagreb, Croatia

In 1873, Nietzsche wrote a fragment called 'Time Atom Theory', which was a reworking of Boscovich's Theoria Philosophiae Naturalis redacta ad unicam legem virium in natura existentium. In general, Boscovich's ideas were a large influence on Nietzsche's ideas of force and the will to power.

In the 1930s, Werner Heisenberg nicknamed Boscovich the Croatian Leibniz. In 1935, a lunar crater - the Boscovich crater - was named after him for his contributions to astronomy. The largest Croatian institute of natural sciences and technology, based in Zagreb, is called "Ruđer Bošković Institute" since 1950. The oldest astronomical society in the Balkans based in Serbia's capital Belgrade is called Astronomical Society Ruđer Bošković since 1953.

The asteroid 14361 Boscovich is named after him.

Chemist Harold Hartley called Boscovich "one of the great intellectual figures of all ages", and he has further been regarded as "the greatest genius Yugoslavia has ever produced".

In 1987, on the occasion of the 200th anniversary of Boscovich's death, the Yugoslav state Post based in Belgrade made a postage stamp and postcard on which is written that Boskovich was "the greatest Croatian scientist of his time".

In 2023, Dubrovnik Ruđer Bošković Airport was renamed in Boscovich's honour, while the government of nearby Trebinje wanted to do the same for their prospective airport.

== Nationality ==
The modern concept of nationality, based on ethnic concepts such as language, culture, religion, custom, etc., was developed only in the 19th century. For this reason the attribution of a definite "nationality" to personalities of the previous centuries, living in ethnically mixed regions, is often indeterminable; Bošković's legacy is consequently celebrated in Croatia, Italy and Serbia. His ethnicity is also part of the Serb-Croat distinctions in self-identification of the Western South Slavic enlighteners, that was one of the major problems in 20th century Yugoslavia.

A number of sources state that he referred to his Croatian identity. In writings to his sister Anica (Anna), he told her he had not forgotten the Croatian language. In a letter to his brother from 1757, he describes the encounter with Croatian soldiers in Vienna and remarks at the end of the letter: "Eviva Haddick e i nostri Croati!" ("Long life to Hadik and to our Croats!"). While living in Paris and attending to a military parade where he saw a Croatian unit from Ragusa, his words were: "there are my brave Croats".

Italian sources claim that Boscovich was remembered as an Italian. According to Italian sources, he was born in a city with mixed cultures, Croatian and Italian, and the higher social strata of Dubrovnik were under Italian influence (Roman-Dalmatian influence). His mother's family came from Italy, and his life and career had strong Italian influences. He moved to Italy at age 14, where he spent most of his life. In some encyclopedias, he is described as an Italian scientist. He used the Italian language in private, including in correspondence with his brother Baro, and Voltaire wrote to Boscovich in Italian "as a sign of respect". Boscovich himself was proud of his Dalmatian identity. When d'Alembert in his Opuscule mathématiques… called him "an Italian mathematician", he shot back that he was "a Dalmatian from Dubrovnik, and not an Italian". However, he added that he had been living in Italy for a long time since his first youth, so "he can in some way be called Italian".

The Serbian Academy of Sciences and Arts ranks him among the 100 most prominent Serbs, According to one source, branches of the brotherhood are said to have settled the surroundings of Stolac. A number of sources claim that Boscovich is a Serbian scientist or state that he is of Serbian paternal origin.

== Works ==
Boscovich published eight scientific dissertations prior to his 1744 ordination as a priest and appointment as a professor and another 14 afterwards. The following is a partial list of his publications:

- De maculis solaribus (1736) (On Sunspots)
- De maculis solaribus exercitatio astronomica (1736) (An astronomical exercise on sunspots)
- De Mercurii novissimo infra Solem transitu (1737) (On the most recent transit of Mercury across the Sun)
- Trigonometriae sphaericae constructio (1737) (The construction of trigonometric spheres)
- De aurora boreali (1738) (On the Aurora Borealis)
- De novo telescopii usu ad objecta coelestia determinanda (1739) (On the new use of the telescope for determining celestial objects)
- De veterum argumentis pro telluris sphaericitate (1739) (On the arguments of the ancients for the sphericity of the earth)
- Dissertatio de telluris figura (1739) (A dissertation on the shape of the earth)
- De Circulis osculatoribus, Dissertatio (1740) (A dissertation on intersections of circles)
- De motu corporum projectorum in spatio non-resistente (1741) (On the motion of unresisting projected bodies in space)
- De inaequalitate gravitatis in diversis terrae locis (1741) (On the inequality of gravity in diverse places on earth)
- De natura et usu infinitorum et infinite parvorum (1741) (On the nature and use of infinites and infinitessimals)
- De annusi fixarum aberrationibus (1742) (On the annual aberration of the fixed stars)
- De observationibus astronomicis et quo pertingat earundem certitudo (1742) (On astronomical observations and the certitude which pertains to them)
- Disquisitio in universam astronomiam (1742) (A disquisition on universal astronomy)
- Parere di tre Matematici sopra i danni che si sono trovati nella Cupola di S. Pietro (1742) (On the opinion of three mathematicians concerning the damage to the dome of St Peter's)
- De motu corporis attracti in centrum immobile viribus decrescentibus in ratione distantiarum reciproca duplicata in spatiis non-resistentibus (1743) (On the motion of an attracted body around an immobile centre by forces decreasing by the duplicate reciprocal proportion in non-resisting spaces)
- Riflessioni de' Padri Tommaso Le Seur, Francesco Jacquier de el' Ordine de' Minimi, e Ruggiero Giuseppe Boscovich della Compagnia di Gesù Sopra alcune difficoltà spettanti i danni, e Risarcimenti della Cupola Di S. Pietro (1743) (Reflections of Fathers Tommaso Le Seur, Francis Jacquier of the Order of Minimi, and Ruggiero Giuseppe Boscovich of the Society of Jesus on problems due to damage to, and repair of, the dome of St. Peter's) Link to full text
- Nova methodus adhibendi phasium observationes in eclipsibus lunaribus ad exercendam geometriam et promovendam astronomiam (1744) (A new method for using observations of phases in lunar eclipses for cultivating geometry and advancing astronomy)
- De cyloide et logistica (1745) (On the cycloid and the logistic curve)
- De viribus vivis (1745) (On living forces)
- Trigonometria sphaerica (1745) (Spherical trigonometry)
- De cometis (1746) (On comets)
- Dissertatio de maris aestu (1747) (A dissertation on the tides of the ocean)
- Dissertatio de lumine, 1–2 (1748/1749) (A dissertation on light)
- De determinanda orbita planetae ope catoptricae ex datis vi celeritate & directione motus in dato puncto (1749) (On determining the orbits of a planet by the aid of catoptrics/reflections given the force, speed and direction of motion at a given point)
- Sopra il Turbine che la notte tra gli XI e XII giugno del MDCCXLIX danneggio una gran parte di Roma (1749; Latin translation 1766) (Upon the whirlwind that on the night between 11 and 12 June 1749 damaged a large part of Rome)
- De centrogravitatis (1751) (On the centre of gravity)
- Elementorum matheseos ad usum studiosae juventutis (1752) (The elements of mathematics for the use of young students)
- De lunae atmosphaera (1753) (On the atmosphere of the moon)
- De continuitatis lege et eius consectariis pertinentibus ad prima materiae elementa eorumque vires dissertatio (1754) (A dissertation on the law of continuity and its consequences pertaining to the first elements of matter and of its powers)
- Elementorium universae matheseos, 1–3 (1757) (Elements of general mathematics)
- De lege virium in natura existentium (1755) (On the law of powers in the nature of existing things)
- De lentibus et telescopiis dioptricis disertatio (1755) (Of dioptric lenses and telescopes)
- De inaequalitatibus quas Saturnus et Jupiter sibi mutuo videntur inducere praesertim circa tempus conjunctionis (1756) (On the inequalities which Saturn and Jupiter seem to induce between themselves particularly around times of conjunction)
- Theoria philosophiae naturalis (1758) (A Theory of Natural Philosophy) link to full text
- De Solis ac Lunae defectibus (1760) (On the sun, moon and eclipses)
- Scrittura sulli danni osservati nell' edificio della Biblioteca Cesarea di Vienna, e loro riparazione (1763) (Writing on the damage observed in the building of the Library of Caesarea Vienna, and their repair)
- Memorie sopra il Porti di Rimini (1765) (A memoir on the Ports of Rimini)
- Sentimento sulla solidità della nuova Guglia del Duomo di Milano (1765) (Sentiments concerning the soundness of the new Spire of the Duomo of Milan)
- dissertationes quinque ad dioptricam pertinentes (1767) (Five dissertations pertaining to dioptrics)
- Voyage astronomique et geographique (1770) (An astronomic and geographic voyage)
- Memorie sulli cannocchiali diottrici (1771) (A memoir on dioptric telescopes)
- Journal d'un voyage de Constantinople en Pologne. 1772. (Journal of a voyage from Constantinople to Poland)
- Sullo sbocco dell'Adige in Mare (1779) (On the mouth of the River Adige)
- Riflessioni sulla relazione del Sig. Abate Ximenes appartenente al Progetto di un nuovo Ozzeri nello Stato Lucchese (1782) (Comments on the report of Signor Abbot Ximenes concerning the project for the Nuovo Ozzeri drainage channel in Lucca)
- Giornale di un viaggio da Costantinopoli in Polonia. 1784. (Journal of a voyage from Constantinople to Poland of Abbot Ruggiero Giuseppe Boscovich, together with his report of the ruins of Troy)
- Opera pertinentia ad opticam et astronomiam, 1–5 (1785) (Works pertaining to optics and astronomy)
- Sui danni del Porto di Savona, loro cagioni e rimedi (1771) (On the damage to the port of Savona, its causes and possible repairs)
- Lettere a Giovan Stefano Conti (1780) (Letter to Giovan Stefano Conti)

== See also ==
- List of Catholic clergy scientists
- Lancelot Law Whyte
- Pietro De Martino
- Boscovich's cardoid
- Le Sage's theory of gravitation
- Least absolute deviations
- Quantile regression
- Will to power
