= Nikola Bošković =

Ragusan merchant (1642–1721)

- Born: 1642; Orahov Do, Ottoman Empire (modern-day Bosnia and Herzegovina)
- Died: 18 September 1721 (aged 78–79); Dubrovnik, Republic of Ragusa (modern-day Croatia)
- Citizenship: Republic of Ragusa
- Occupations: writer, trader
- Spouse: Paola Bettera

Nikola Bošković (pronounced [nǐkola bôʃkoʋit͡ɕ], 1642 – 18 September 1721) was a Ragusan merchant, whose travels in Ottoman Raška were included in Illyricum sacrum. He is best known as the father of Roger Joseph Boscovich (Ruđer Bošković).

== Origin ==
Franjo Rački wrote, based on a manuscript from the Franciscan library in Dubrovnik, that Nikola was the son of a Boško from Orahovo (Orahov Do, near Popovo polje, then Bosnia Eyalet, Ottoman Empire, present-day Bosnia and Herzegovina), and that the family had adopted the surname Bošković after his father. He had a brother, Petar (d. 1724).

Šime Ljubić, and later Milenko S. Filipović and Ljubo Mićević, wrote that his father's name was actually Matijaš (or Matija) which could be seen from the marital permission which he gave to Nikola.

Boško Bošković, father of Nikola Bošković, was mentioned in a document from 1690 ("Bosikus Boscouich de Popouo mihi cancellario optime notus") from which is evident that the family surname Bošković is much older and was the surname of his ancestors long time before they arrived to Dubrovnik.

== Work ==
Nikola came to Ragusa (Dubrovnik), Republic of Ragusa, as a boy when his parents had sent him to become an apprentice to wealthy Ragusan merchant Rad Gleđević, who then dispatched him to Yeni Pazar (Novi Pazar) in the Ottoman Empire (in the Raška region of today's Serbia) to learn from the local traders. Bošković returned to Dubrovnik as a very wealthy man. His father then also moved to Dubrovnik.

His travels through "Raška" (Old Serbia) were written down by a Jesuit priest Riggeputti as Relazione della Provincia della Rassia, who was collecting material for his work Illyricum Sacrum, a history of Christianity in Southeastern Europe. Bošković described the historical and sacral monuments of Raška including Orthodox monasteries and royal palaces, and also commented on the "sad state" of the Roman Catholic Church in these lands under the Ottoman rule. After settling down in Dubrovnik, Nikola married a daughter of a local noble of Italian origin, Paola Bettera (Pavica Betera). The two had eight children, the second youngest, Ruđer Bošković (Roger Boscovich), being the most famous.

== Origin debate ==
There is a debate on the ethnicity and origin of Nikola Bošković.

In 1910, Branislav Petronijević reviewed an article by Vladimir Varićak about Ruđer Bošković and stated that Ruđer Bošković's descent is "at least as much Serb as it is Croat" and that the Serbian Academy of Sciences and Arts (in Belgrade) should collaborate with the Yugoslav Academy of Sciences and Arts (in Zagreb) to publish a reprint of all of Bošković's works to celebrate the 200th anniversary of his birth.

An English translation of Bošković's "Theory of Natural Philosophy" was published by the Open Court Publishing Company in 1922, prefaced by Branislav Petronijević's biography of Bošković. In 1925, Vladimir Varićak published a review of it, and criticized it extensively for various factual errors, among other things for asserting without references that the Bošković family was "of purely Servian origin", that Boško was "an orthodox Serbian peasant" and that Nikola became "a Roman Catholic" in Dubrovnik.

In 1995, a Montenegrin author named Slobodan Šćepanović published an article in the journal of the Institute of History of Montenegro where he claimed, based partly on "oral history", that Nikola Bošković converted to the Catholic faith from Orthodoxy, and that he was a descended from a Montenegrin clan.

According to Serbian sources, the Bošković brotherhood, originally surnamed Pokrajčić, had settled the village from the surrounding mountains of Popovo. Branches of the brotherhood also settled the surroundings of Stolac.

In 2012, the Serbian newspaper Press published an article claiming Nikola Bošković was a Serb, based partly on Serbian president Boris Tadić's claims that Ruđer Bošković was a "Serb Catholic". Croatian academics lambasted such claims, with Croatian Academy of Sciences and Arts members saying Tadić "needed to learn something", and another saying it was beneath him to even comment on such a statement.
