= 2002–03 PFC CSKA Sofia season =

CSKA Sofia
2002–03 season
- Chairman: Vassil Bozhkov
- Manager: Stoycho Mladenov
- A Group: Champions
- Bulgarian Cup: Semi-final
- UEFA Cup: First round
- Top goalscorer: League: Emil Gargorov (14); All: Emil Gargorov (19)
- Highest home attendance: 18,000 vs Blackburn Rovers (3 October 2002)
- Lowest home attendance: 650 vs Rilski Sportist (7 December 2002)

The 2002–03 season was PFC CSKA Sofia's 56th consecutive season in A Group.

Below is a list of player statistics and all matches (official and friendly) that the club played during the 2002–03 season.

== Squad ==
Note: Flags indicate national team as defined under FIFA eligibility rules; some limited exceptions apply. Players may hold more than one non-FIFA nationality.

No.	Pos.	Nation	Player
1	GK	BUL	Ivaylo Ivanov
3	DF	BUL	Galin Ivanov
4	DF	ARG	Marcos Charras
5	MF	BUL	Todor Yanchev
6	DF	BUL	Aleksandar Tomash
7	MF	BUL	Hristo Yanev
8	FW	BUL	Velizar Dimitrov
9	FW	BRA	Agnaldo
10	MF	BUL	Metodi Deyanov
12	GK	BUL	Stoyan Kolev
13	DF	BUL	Yordan Varbanov
14	MF	BUL	Svetoslav Petrov

No.	Pos.	Nation	Player
15	MF	MKD	Artim Šakiri
16	FW	BUL	Petar Zlatkov
18	FW	BUL	Gerasim Zakov
19	MF	BUL	Ivan Pavlov
20	MF	POR	João Paulo Brito
21	FW	RSA	MacDonald Mukasi
22	GK	BUL	Ventsislav Velinov
25	DF	BRA	João Carlos
23	FW	BUL	Emil Gargorov
27	MF	BUL	Petar Zlatinov
29	DF	SEN	Ibrahima Gueye

== Competitions ==
=== A Group ===
==== Table ====
Pos	Team	Pld	W	D	L	GF	GA	GD	Pts	Qualification or relegation
1	CSKA Sofia (C)	26	21	3	2	67	16	+51	66	Qualification for Champions League second qualifying round
2	Levski Sofia	26	19	3	4	61	19	+42	60	Qualification for UEFA Cup qualifying round
3	Litex Lovech	26	17	4	5	49	22	+27	55	Qualification for UEFA Cup qualifying round
4	Slavia Sofia	26	16	3	7	57	30	+27	51	
5	Cherno More	26	14	6	6	42	21	+21	48	

Source: A PFG (in Bulgarian)
Rules for classification: 1st points; 2nd head-to-head points; 3rd head-to-head goal difference; 4th head-to-head goals scored; 5th head-to-head away goals scored; 6th season goal difference; 7th season goals scored; 8th "sportsmanship" (R & Y cards); 9th draw
(C) Champions

==== Results summary ====
Overall								Home						Away					
Pld	W	D	L	GF	GA	GD	Pts	W	D	L	GF	GA	GD	W	D	L	GF	GA	GD
26	21	3	2	67	16	+51	66	12	0	1	35	9	+26	9	3	1	32	7	+25

Last updated: 31 May 2003.
Source: CSKA Sofia league results

==== Results by round ====
Round	1	2	3	4	5	6	7	8	9	10	11	12	13	14	15	16	17	18	19	20	21	22	23	24	25	26
Ground	H	A	H	H	A	H	A	H	A	H	A	H	A	A	H	A	A	H	A	H	A	H	A	H	A	H
Result	W	W	W	W	W	W	W	W	W	W	W	W	W	D	W	D	W	W	W	L	W	W	D	W	L	W
Position	3	2	1	1	1	1	1	1	1	1	1	1	1	1	1	1	1	1	1	1	1	1	1	1	1	1

Source: CSKA Sofia league results
W = Win; D = Draw; L = Loss

==== Fixtures and results ====
10 August 2002 1	CSKA	3–1	Spartak Varna	Sofia
20:30	Gargorov 20' (pen.); Brito 37'; V. Dimitrov 63'		Krumov 41'	Stadium: Balgarska Armiya; Attendance: 5,000; Referee: Kancho Dimitrov

18 August 2002 2	Lokomotiv Sofia	0–2	CSKA	Sofia
18:00			Petrov 40'; Gargorov 75' (pen.)	Stadium: Lokomotiv; Attendance: 7,000; Referee: Yordan Ivanov

24 August 2002 3	CSKA	2–0	Rilski Sportist	Sofia
20:00	Yanev 18'; V. Dimitrov 21' (pen.)			Stadium: Balgarska Armiya; Attendance: 7,000; Referee: Hristo Ristoskov

1 September 2002 4	CSKA	1–0	Lokomotiv Plovdiv	Sofia
20:00	Šakiri 17'; Yanev (red card) 82'		Paskov (red card) 88'	Stadium: Balgarska Armiya; Attendance: 14,000; Referee: Georgi Narlev

13 September 2002 5	Dobrudzha	0–5	CSKA	Dobrich
18:00			João Carlos 3'; Mukansi 14', 65'; V. Dimitrov 25', 44'	Stadium: Druzhba; Referee: Valeri Petrovski

22 September 2002 6	CSKA	4–1	Chernomorets	Sofia
19:00	Agnaldo 63'; Mukansi 69'; Gargorov 73'; João Carlos 81'		Stanev 14'	Stadium: Balgarska Armiya; Attendance: 10,000; Referee: Lachezar Yonov

28 September 2002 7	Cherno More	0–1	CSKA	Varna
16:00	Mihaylov (red card) 73'		V. Dimitrov 71'; João Carlos (red card) 90'	Stadium: Ticha; Attendance: 8,000; Referee: Anton Genov

6 October 2002 8	CSKA	5–2	Marek	Sofia
18:00	Gargorov 2', 57' (pen.); Šakiri 11' (pen.), 46'; Agnaldo 49'		Mujiri 21'; Bibishkov 71'	Stadium: Balgarska Armiya; Attendance: 2,500

20 October 2002 9	Slavia	0–2	CSKA	Sofia
15:00			V. Dimitrov 70'; Šakiri 85'	Stadium: Slavia; Attendance: 5,000; Referee: Yordan Stalev

26 October 2002 10	CSKA	3–0	Levski	Sofia
16:00	Mukansi 12', 55'; Petrov 45'			Stadium: Balgarska Armiya; Attendance: 15,000; Referee: Ivan Dobrinov

2 November 2002 11	Botev Plovdiv	1–5	CSKA	Plovdiv
17:00	B. Dimitrov 53'		Šakiri 58'; V. Dimitrov 59', 66'; Mukansi 61'; Yanchev 75'	Stadium: Hristo Botev; Attendance: 5,000; Referee: Stefan Gospodinov

9 November 2002 12	CSKA	1–0	Litex	Sofia
17:00	V. Dimitrov 45'; Gargorov (penalty missed) 90+3'		Tiago Silva (red card) 50'; Bachev (red card) 90+2'	Stadium: Balgarska Armiya; Attendance: 7,000; Referee: Momchil Vraykov

24 November 2002 13	Naftex	0–1	CSKA	Burgas
17:00			V. Dimitrov 39'	Stadium: Lazur; Attendance: 15,000; Referee: Valeri Petrovski

22 February 2003 14	Spartak Varna	1–1	CSKA	Varna
14:00	Krumov 62'		Gargorov 18'	Stadium: Spartak; Attendance: 2,000; Referee: Anton Genov

28 February 2003 15	CSKA	2–0	Lokomotiv Sofia	Sofia
16:30	Mukansi 54'; Gargorov 74'			Stadium: Balgarska Armiya; Referee: Dimitar Kostov

8 March 2003 16	Rilski Sportist	1–1	CSKA	Samokov
15:30	Videnov 12'		Gargorov 90+2'	Stadium: Iskar; Attendance: 7,000; Referee: Dimitar Dimitrov

15 March 2003 17	Lokomotiv Plovdiv	0–3 (w/o)	CSKA	Plovdiv
14:00				Stadium: Lokomotiv; Attendance: 500; Referee: Ivan Dobrinov
Note: Lokomotiv Plovdiv did not appear on the field in protest because of the penalty imposed on them for deprivation of home ground by the Bulgarian Football Union. So after 15 minutes the referee ended the match without it being played. The Bulgarian Football Union's STK awarded an official victory to CSKA and deducted three points from Lokomotiv's assets for failure to appear.

22 March 2003 18	CSKA	3–0	Dobrudzha	Sofia
17:30	Agnaldo 63'; Gargorov 76' (pen.); Brito 90'			Stadium: Balgarska Armiya; Attendance: 3,000; Referee: Stanislav Todorov

5 April 2003 19	Chernomorets	2–8	CSKA	Burgas
17:00	16min Own goal: 23. Gargorov 16' (o.g.); Ivanikov (red card) 58'; Kolev 75'		Gargorov 39', 45' (pen.), 85'; Tomash 51'; Brito 56', 90+1'; V. Dimitrov 79' (pen.); Yanchev 89'	Stadium: Chernomorets; Attendance: 3,000; Referee: Stefan Gospodinov

12 April 2003 20	CSKA	1–2	Cherno More	Sofia
17:45	Gargorov 28' (pen.)		Petrov 45' (o.g.); G. Iliev 74'; Gerasimov (red card) 81'	Stadium: Balgarska Armiya; Attendance: 2,500; Referee: Georgi Videlov

20 April 2003 21	Marek	0–2	CSKA	Dupnitsa
15:00			Gargorov 28'; V. Dimitrov 60'	Stadium: Bonchuk; Attendance: 2,500; Referee: Kancho Dimitrov

26 April 2003 22	CSKA	3–1	Slavia	Sofia
15:00	Brito 8'; Todorov 30'; Mukansi 44'		Vladimirov 75'	Stadium: Vasil Levski; Attendance: 11,000; Referee: Ivan Dobrinov

10 May 2003 23	Levski	1–1	CSKA	Sofia
18:00	Kolev 49'		Brito 61'	Stadium: Georgi Asparuhov; Attendance: 14,000; Referee: Momchil Vraykov

17 May 2003 24	CSKA	2–0	Botev Plovdiv	Sofia
17:00	Mukansi 31'; Brito 65'			Stadium: Balgarska Armiya; Attendance: 17,000; Referee: Galin Moskalev

24 May 2003 25	Litex	1–0	CSKA	Lovech
17:00	N. Dimitrov 15'; Nikolov (penalty missed) 18'; Zhelev (red card) 38'; Jelenković (red card) 61'		Gueye (red card) 61'; Šakiri (red card) 82'	Stadium: Gradski; Attendance: 800; Referee: Tsvetan Georgiev

31 May 2003 26	CSKA	5–2	Naftex	Sofia
17:30	V. Dimitrov 7'; Agnaldo 14'; Petrov 29'; Yanchev 37'; Charras 51'		Kiselichkov 42' (pen.), 65'; Trendafilov (red card) 59'	Stadium: Balgarska Armiya; Attendance: 16,000; Referee: Anton Genov

=== Bulgarian Cup ===
30 October 2002 Second round Leg 1	Belasitsa Petrich	2−3	CSKA	Petrich
14:00	Radojičić 56'; Salis 85'		Deyanov 38'; Šakiri 61'; Zlatkov 73'	Stadium: Tsar Samuil; Attendance: 5,000; Referee: Kancho Dimitrov

16 November 2002 Second round Leg 2	CSKA	3−2 (6−4 agg.)	Belasitsa Petrich	Sofia
14:00	Agnaldo 10'; V. Dimitrov 19'; Gargorov 58' (pen.)		Junivan 52', 71'	Stadium: Balgarska Armiya; Attendance: 2,000; Referee: Petar Stoyanov

30 November 2002 Third round Leg 1	Rilski Sportist	2−1	CSKA	Samokov
13:30	Kirov 26' (pen.); Gemedzhiev 54'; Adzhov (red card) 78'		Yanchev 39'; Yanchev (red card) 78'	Stadium: Iskar; Attendance: 15,000; Referee: Kostadin Kostadinov

7 December 2002 Third round Leg 2	CSKA	6−0 (7−2 agg.)	Rilski Sportist	Sofia
13:30 EEST	Sokolov 8' (o.g.); Šakiri 13'; Agnaldo 33', 86'; Brito 52'; Mukansi 90'			Stadium: Balgarska Armiya; Attendance: 650; Referee: Zhivko Dimitrov

19 February 2003 Quarter-final Leg 1	CSKA	3−2	Makedonska Slava	Sofia
13:30	Gargorov 7', 75' (pen.); V. Dimitrov 73'		Gerganchev 45+1'; Gueye 52' (o.g.)	Stadium: Balgarska Armiya; Attendance: 1,100; Referee: Kamen Aleksiev

4 March 2003 Quarter-final Leg 2	Makedonska Slava	0−1 (2−4 agg.)	CSKA	Simitli
14:00			Yanchev 81'	Stadium: Struma; Attendance: 5,500; Referee: Kancho Dimitrov

16 April 2003 Semi-final Leg 1	CSKA	0−1	Levski Sofia	Sofia
17:00			Mendoza 90+4'	Stadium: Balgarska Armiya; Attendance: 15,000; Referee: Ivan Dobrinov (Sofia)

3 May 2003 Semi-final Leg 2	Levski Sofia	0−0 (1−0 agg.)	CSKA	Sofia
17:30	Angelov (red card) 70'		Yanev (red card) 70'	Stadium: Georgi Asparuhov; Attendance: 17,000; Referee: Anton Genov (Gabrovo)

=== UEFA Cup ===
==== Qualifying round ====
15 August 2002 First leg	Dinamo Minsk (Belarus)	1–4	(Bulgaria) CSKA	Minsk, Belarus
19:00	Tsyhalka 66'	Report	Mukasi 18'; Dimitrov 28', 47'; Brito 31'	Stadium: Dinamo Stadium; Attendance: 3,562; Referee: René Rogalla (Switzerland)

29 August 2002 Second leg	CSKA (Bulgaria)	1–0 (5–1 agg.)	(Belarus) Dinamo Minsk	Sofia, Bulgaria
20:30	Šakiri 64' (pen.)	Report		Stadium: Balgarska Armiya; Attendance: 3,254; Referee: Bertrand Layec (France)

==== First round ====
19 September 2002 First leg	Blackburn Rovers (England)	1–1	(Bulgaria) CSKA	Blackburn, England
22:00	Grabbi 27'	Report	Dimitrov 23'	Stadium: Ewood Park; Attendance: 18,300; Referee: Bruno Coué (France)

3 October 2002 Second leg	CSKA (Bulgaria)	3–3 (4–4(a) agg.)	(England) Blackburn Rovers	Sofia, Bulgaria
19:30	Gargorov 66', 88' (pen.); Agnaldo 69'	Report	Thompson 30'; Østenstad 56'; Duff 58'	Stadium: Balgarska Armiya; Attendance: 18,000; Referee: Alon Yefet (Israel)
