= 2003–04 PFC CSKA Sofia season =

CSKA Sofia
2003–04 season
- Chairman: Vassil Bozhkov
- Manager: Stoycho Mladenov (until 15 October 2003); Aleksandar Stankov (from 15 October 2003 to 3 February 2004); Ferario Spasov
- A Group: Third place
- Bulgarian Cup: Runner-up
- UEFA Champions League: Third qualifying round
- UEFA Cup: First round
- Top goalscorer: League: Emil Gargorov (15); All: Emil Gargorov (19)
- Highest home attendance: 20,000 vs Levski Sofia (24 April 2004)
- Lowest home attendance: 250 vs Belasitsa Petrich (5 May 2004)

The 2003–04 season was PFC CSKA Sofia's 57th consecutive season in A Group.

Below is a list of player statistics and all matches (official and friendly) that the club played during the 2003–04 season.

== Squad ==
Note: Flags indicate national team as defined under FIFA eligibility rules; some limited exceptions apply. Players may hold more than one non-FIFA nationality.

No.	Pos.	Nation	Player
1	GK	BUL	Ivaylo Ivanov
2	DF	BUL	Georgi Antonov
3	DF	BUL	Yordan Varbanov
4	MF	ARG	Marcos Charras
5	MF	BUL	Todor Yanchev
6	DF	BUL	Aleksandar Tomash
7	MF	BUL	Hristo Yanev
8	FW	BUL	Velizar Dimitrov
9	FW	BRA	Souza
10	MF	BRA	Léo Lima
10	MF	GEO	Amiran Mujiri
11	FW	BUL	Stoycho Mladenov Jr.
12	GK	BUL	Stoyan Kolev
13	MF	BUL	Konstantin Mirchev
14	MF	BUL	Svetoslav Petrov

No.	Pos.	Nation	Player
15	FW	BUL	Gerasim Zakov
16	MF	BUL	Rumen Trifonov
17	MF	BUL	Martin Kerchev
18	MF	BUL	Petar Stanev
19	FW	BUL	Evgeni Yordanov
20	MF	POR	João Paulo Brito
21	FW	RSA	MacDonald Mukansi
21	FW	BUL	Stoyko Sakaliev
22	GK	BUL	Genko Slavov
23	FW	BUL	Emil Gargorov
25	DF	BRA	João Carlos
27	DF	BUL	Radoslav Mitrevski
29	DF	SEN	Ibrahima Gueye
30	DF	BUL	Yordan Todorov
77	MF	ALB	Altin Haxhi

== Competitions ==
=== A Group ===
==== Table ====
Pos	Team	Pld	W	D	L	GF	GA	GD	Pts	Qualification or relegation
1	Lokomotiv Plovdiv (C)	30	24	3	3	74	24	+50	75	Qualification for Champions League second qualifying round
2	Levski Sofia	30	22	6	2	59	16	+43	72	Qualification for UEFA Cup second qualifying round
3	CSKA Sofia	30	20	5	5	65	28	+37	65	Qualification for UEFA Cup second qualifying round
4	Litex Lovech	30	18	10	2	43	20	+23	64	Qualification for UEFA Cup second qualifying round
5	Slavia Sofia	30	18	3	9	57	30	+27	57	

Source: A PFG (in Bulgarian)
Rules for classification: 1st points; 2nd head-to-head points; 3rd head-to-head goal difference; 4th head-to-head goals scored; 5th head-to-head away goals scored; 6th season goal difference; 7th season goals scored; 8th "sportsmanship" (R & Y cards); 9th draw
(C) Champions

==== Results summary ====
Overall								Home						Away					
Pld	W	D	L	GF	GA	GD	Pts	W	D	L	GF	GA	GD	W	D	L	GF	GA	GD
30	20	5	5	65	28	+37	65	12	2	1	38	10	+28	8	3	4	27	18	+9

Last updated: 15 May 2004.
Source: Soccerway

==== Results by round ====
Round	1	2	3	4	5	6	7	8	9	10	11	12	13	14	15	16	17	18	19	20	21	22	23	24	25	26	27	28	29	30
Ground	H	A	H	H	A	H	A	H	A	H	A	H	A	H	A	A	H	A	A	H	A	H	A	H	A	H	A	H	A	H
Result	W	W	D	W	W	W	L	W	W	W	D	W	W	W	L	D	W	L	W	W	D	W	W	W	W	L	W	W	L	D
Position	4	2	2	2	2	2	2	2	2	2	2	2	2	1	2	3	3	4	3	2	4	3	2	2	2	4	3	3	3	3

Source: CSKA Sofia league results
W = Win; D = Draw; L = Loss

==== Fixtures and results ====
9 August 2003 1	CSKA	2–1	Naftex	Sofia
20:00	Yanev 9'; Gargorov 48' (pen.)		Sakaliev 75'	Stadium: Balgarska Armiya; Attendance: 3,500; Referee: Kancho Dimitrov

17 August 2003 2	Slavia	2–4	CSKA	Sofia
18:00	Vladimirov 10'; B. Georgiev 90+2' (pen.)		Gargorov 7'; Léo Lima 9'; Yordanov 20'; Yanev 85'	Stadium: Slavia; Attendance: 4,500; Referee: Ivan Dobrinov

23 August 2003 3	CSKA	1–1	Litex	Sofia
20:30	Yordanov 30'		Tiago Silva 59'	Stadium: Balgarska Armiya; Attendance: 5,500; Referee: Hristo Ristoskov

31 August 2003 4	CSKA	4–1	Makedonska slava	Sofia
19:00	Gargorov 26' (pen.), 90+1'; Yordanov 68'; S. Georgiev 76' (o.g.)		Evtimov 73'	Stadium: Balgarska Armiya; Attendance: 2,000; Referee: Georgi Ignatov

13 September 2003 5	Marek	0–3	CSKA	Dupnitsa
16:00	Bonev (red card) 83'		João Carlos 3'; Gargorov 44', 48'	Stadium: Bonchuk; Attendance: 4,000; Referee: Zhivko Dimitrov

20 September 2003 6	CSKA	2–0	Spartak Varna	Sofia
19:00	Yordanov 7'; Dimitrov 34'		D. Georgiev (red card) 72'	Stadium: Balgarska Armiya; Attendance: 3,500; Referee: Kostadin Kostadinov

28 September 2003 7	Botev Plovdiv	3–1	CSKA	Plovdiv
15:00	Germanov 21'; Dafchev 26' (pen.), 69'; Pashev (red card) 77'		Yanev 19'; Gargorov (penalty missed) 40', 52'; João Carlos (red card) 89'	Stadium: Hristo Botev; Attendance: 5,000; Referee: Tsvetan Georgiev

3 October 2003 8	CSKA	3–0	Chernomorets	Sofia
16:45	Léo Lima 32', 70'; Yanev 59'			Stadium: Balgarska Armiya; Referee: Stanislav Todorov

19 October 2003 9	Vidima-Rakovski	0–1	CSKA	Sevlievo
14:30	Zelenkov (red card) 33'		Yordanov 74'	Stadium: Rakovski; Attendance: 4,500; Referee: Stefan Gospodinov

24 October 2003 10	CSKA	3–0	Lokomotiv Sofia	Sofia
15:30	Gargorov 31', 76'; Yanev 42'			Stadium: Balgarska Armiya; Attendance: 1,500; Referee: Galin Moskalev

31 October 2003 11	Levski	1–1	CSKA	Sofia
15:30	Kolev 54'		Gargorov 53'; Yanev (red card) 76'	Stadium: Vasil Levski; Attendance: 13,000; Referee: Angel Bekyarov

8 November 2003 12	CSKA	1–0	Rodopa	Sofia
16:30	Gargorov 20'			Stadium: Balgarska Armiya; Attendance: 2,000; Referee: Kolyo Danev

22 November 2003 13	Belasitsa	0–4	CSKA	Petrich
14:00	Salis (red card) 79'		Dimitrov 6'; João Carlos 24'; Brito 30'; Yordanov 37'	Stadium: Tsar Samuil; Attendance: 4,000; Referee: Anton Genov

30 November 2003 14	CSKA	2–0	Cherno More	Sofia
16:30	Gargorov 62', 79' (pen.)			Stadium: Balgarska Armiya; Attendance: 1,500; Referee: Momchil Vraykov

8 December 2003 15	Lokomotiv Plovdiv	3–1	CSKA	Plovdiv
14:00	Jayeoba 5'; Paskov 34'; Mihaylov 55'		Gargorov 22'	Stadium: Lokomotiv; Attendance: 10,000; Referee: Kostadin Kostadinov

13 February 2004 16	Naftex	3–3	CSKA	Burgas
14:30	Bornosuzov 8'; S. Petrov 44' (o.g.); Morales 82'		Gargorov 5'; Yanev 14'; Dimitrov 76'	Stadium: Lazur; Attendance: 3,500; Referee: Angel Bekyarov

21 February 2004 17	CSKA	2–1	Slavia	Sofia
16:00	Sakaliev 31'; Ambartsumyan 58' (o.g.)		Bachev 46'	Stadium: Balgarska Armiya; Attendance: 7,000; Referee: Galin Moskalev

28 February 2004 18	Litex	1–0	CSKA	Lovech
16:00	Belyakov 24'		Gargorov (penalty missed) 58'	Stadium: Gradski; Attendance: 6,000; Referee: Anton Genov

6 March 2004 19	Makedonska slava	0–2	CSKA	Simitli
14:30	Evtimov (red card) 85'		Yanchev 37'; Sakaliev 46'	Stadium: Struma; Attendance: 5,000; Referee: Nikolay Yordanov

13 March 2004 20	CSKA	4–0	Marek	Sofia
16:30	Yanchev 4'; Yordanov 9'; Gueye 62' (pen.); Sakaliev 74'			Stadium: Balgarska Armiya; Attendance: 3,000; Referee: Ahmed Ahmed

19 March 2004 21	Spartak Varna	0–0	CSKA	Varna
15:00			Dimitrov (penalty missed) 80'	Stadium: Spartak; Attendance: 5,500; Referee: Stefan Gospodinov

27 March 2004 22	CSKA	4–1	Botev Plovdiv	Sofia
16:30	Zakov 14', 61'; Yanev 34'; Hazurov 88'		Minev 53'	Stadium: Balgarska Armiya; Referee: Stoyan Aleksiev

3 April 2004 23	Chernomorets	1–3	CSKA	Burgas
15:30	Nedev 24'		Dimitrov 3'; Sakaliev 40', 84'	Stadium: Chernomorets; Attendance: 1,500; Referee: Stanislav Todorov

10 April 2004 24	CSKA	3–1	Vidima-Rakovski	Sofia
16:00	Hazurov 12'; Yanev 35'; S. Petrov 64' (pen.)		Vasilev 21'	Stadium: Balgarska Armiya; Attendance: 1,500; Referee: Dimcho Radev

17 April 2004 25	Lokomotiv Sofia	0–1	CSKA	Sofia
16:00			Sakaliev 19'	Stadium: Lokomotiv; Attendance: 3,800; Referee: Angel Bekyarov

24 April 2004 26	CSKA	1–2	Levski	Sofia
17:00	Yanev 64'; Haxhi (red card) 86'		Temile 85'; Chilikov 90+4'	Stadium: Vasil Levski; Attendance: 20,000; Referee: Kostadin Kostadinov

1 May 2004 27	Rodopa	1–3	CSKA	Smolyan
15:00	I. Petrov 80'		Charras 29'; S. Petrov 43'; João Carlos 75'	Stadium: Septemvri; Attendance: 6,000; Referee: Tsvetan Georgiev

5 May 2004 28	CSKA	5–1	Belasitsa	Sofia
17:30	Hazurov 12', 13', 90+1'; Sakaliev 80'; Yanev 86'		Junivan 85'	Stadium: Balgarska Armiya; Attendance: 250; Referee: Stefan Spasov

8 May 2004 29	Cherno More	3–0	CSKA	Varna
17:30	Genchev 17', 90+1'; Stoyanov 51'			Stadium: Ticha; Attendance: 1,500; Referee: Georgi Ignatov

15 May 2004 30	CSKA	1–1	Lokomotiv Plovdiv	Sofia
17:30	Yanev 62'		Kamburov 87'	Stadium: Balgarska Armiya; Attendance: 5,000; Referee: Stefan Gospodinov

=== Bulgarian Cup ===
28 October 2003 Second round Leg 1	Pirin Blagoevgrad	0–0	CSKA	Blagoevgrad
14:30				Stadium: Hristo Botev; Attendance: 4,000; Referee: Stoyan Aleksiev

12 November 2003 Second round Leg 2	CSKA	2–0 (2–0 agg.)	Pirin Blagoevgrad	Sofia
14:00	Tomash 44'; Yanev 77'			Stadium: Balgarska Armiya; Attendance: 400; Referee: Stanislav Todorov

26 November 2003 Third round Leg 1	CSKA	5–0	Botev Plovdiv	Sofia
14:00	Sv. Petrov 6'; Yanev 12'; Brito 13', 21'; Gargorov 59'			Stadium: Balgarska Armiya; Attendance: 1,300; Referee: Zhivko Gospodinov

3 December 2003 Third round Leg 2	Botev Plovdiv	1–2 (1–7 agg.)	CSKA	Plovdiv
13:00	Milenov 46'		Valkov 16'; Yanev 86'	Stadium: Hristo Botev; Attendance: 1,000; Referee: Ahmed Ahmed

13 December 2003 Quarter-final Leg 1	CSKA	6–0	Rodopa	Sofia
13:00	Gargorov 8', 38'; Yanev 52', 80'; E. Yordanov 67'; Yanchev 70'			Stadium: Balgarska Armiya; Attendance: 300; Referee: Hristo Ristoskov

17 December 2003 Quarter-final Leg 2	Rodopa	1–0 (1–6 agg.)	CSKA	Smolyan
13:00	Filipov 90+2'			Stadium: Septemvri; Attendance: 1,300; Referee: Angel Angelov

7 April 2004 Semi-final Leg 1	Lokomotiv Sofia	0–1	CSKA	Sofia
16:30			Yanev 55'	Stadium: Lokomotiv; Attendance: 3,000; Referee: Anton Genov

21 April 2004 Semi-final Leg 2	CSKA	4–0 (5–0 agg.)	Lokomotiv Sofia	Sofia
16:30	Sakaliev 9'; Yanchev 11'; Yanev 58'; Hazurov 76'			Stadium: Balgarska Armiya; Attendance: 1,500; Referee: Hristo Ristoskov

12 May 2004 Final	Litex	2–2 (a.e.t.) (6–5 p)	CSKA	Sofia
17:30	Zhelev 38'; Hdiouad 85'		João Carlos 57'; Gargorov 72'	Stadium: Vasil Levski; Attendance: 11,461; Referee: Hristo Ristoskov (Sandanski)
	Penalties
	Trică (penalty scored); Zhelev (penalty scored); Jelenković (penalty missed); Dimitrov (penalty missed); Dzhambazov (penalty scored); Bachev (penalty missed); Hdiouad (penalty scored)		(penalty scored) Petrov; (penalty scored) Dimitrov; (penalty scored) Charras; (penalty missed) Yanchev; (penalty missed) Kolev; (penalty missed) Sakaliev; (penalty missed) Gueye

=== UEFA Champions League ===
==== Second qualifying round ====
30 July 2003 First leg	Pyunik (Armenia)	0–2	(Bulgaria) CSKA	Yerevan, Armenia
19:00		Report	Yanchev 20'; Mukasi 48'	Stadium: Vazgen Sargsyan Republican Stadium; Attendance: 13,000; Referee: Martin Ingvarsson (Sweden)

6 August 2003 Second leg	CSKA (Bulgaria)	1–0 (3–0 agg.)	(Armenia) Pyunik	Sofia, Bulgaria
20:30	Léo Lima 90+1'	Report		Stadium: Balgarska Armiya; Attendance: 6,500; Referee: Dougie McDonald (Scotland)

==== Third qualifying round ====
13 August 2003 First leg	Galatasaray (Turkey)	3–0	(Bulgaria) CSKA	Istanbul, Turkey
21:00	Hasan Şaş 3'; Hakan Şükür 6'; Arif 37'	Report		Stadium: Atatürk Olympic Stadium; Attendance: 66,300; Referee: Markus Merk (Germany)

27 August 2003 Second leg	CSKA (Bulgaria)	0–3 (0–6 agg.)	(Turkey) Galatasaray	Sofia, Bulgaria
20:30		Report	César Prates 28'; Sabri 53'; Arif 86'	Stadium: Balgarska Armiya; Attendance: 9,600; Referee: Domenico Messina (Italy)

=== UEFA Cup ===
==== First round ====
24 September 2003 First leg	CSKA (Bulgaria)	1–1	(Russia) Torpedo Moscow	Sofia, Bulgaria
17:00	Dimitrov 18'	Report	Semshov 78'	Stadium: Balgarska Armiya; Attendance: 7,832; Referee: Jouni Hyytiä (Finland)

15 October 2003 Second leg	Torpedo Moscow (Russia)	1–1 (a.e.t.) (2–2 agg.) (3–2 p)	(Bulgaria) CSKA	Moscow, Russia
17:00	Oper 11'	Report	Dimitrov 90+2'	Stadium: Eduard Streltsov Stadium; Attendance: 4,000; Referee: Roland Beck (Liechtenstein)
	Penalties
	Leonchenko (penalty missed); Volkov (penalty scored); Lebedenko (penalty missed); Jolović (penalty scored); Budylin (penalty scored)		(penalty missed) Dimitrov; (penalty scored) Leo Lima; (penalty missed) João Carlos; (penalty scored) Kolev; (penalty missed) Brito
