= 2004–05 PFC CSKA Sofia season =

CSKA Sofia
2004–05 season
- Chairman: Vassil Bozhkov
- Manager: Ferario Spasov (until 23 February 2005); Miodrag Ješić
- A Group: Champions
- Bulgarian Cup: Runner-up
- UEFA Cup: First round
- Top goalscorer: League: Hristo Yanev (22); All: Hristo Yanev (24)
- Highest home attendance: 20,000 vs Steaua București (30 September 2004)
- Lowest home attendance: 700 vs Pirin 1922 (3 May 2005)

The 2004–05 season was PFC CSKA Sofia's 57th consecutive season in A Group.

Below is a list of player statistics and all matches (official and friendly) that the club played during the 2004–05 season.

== Squad ==
Note: Flags indicate national team as defined under FIFA eligibility rules; some limited exceptions apply. Players may hold more than one non-FIFA nationality.

No.	Pos.	Nation	Player
1	GK	BUL	Ivaylo Ivanov
2	DF	SVK	Radoslav Zabavník
3	DF	BUL	Adalbert Zafirov
4	DF	ARG	Marcos Charras
5	MF	BUL	Todor Yanchev
7	MF	BUL	Hristo Yanev
8	FW	BUL	Velizar Dimitrov
9	FW	BUL	Ivan Ploshtakov
10	MF	GEO	Amiran Mujiri
11	DF	CZE	Robert Caha
12	GK	BUL	Hristo Bahtarliev
13	DF	BUL	Yordan Varbanov
14	DF	BUL	Valentin Iliev
15	MF	FRA	Benoît Cauet
17	MF	EST	Joel Lindpere

No.	Pos.	Nation	Player
18	FW	BUL	Gerasim Zakov
19	FW	BUL	Evgeni Yordanov
20	MF	BUL	Yordan Yurukov
21	FW	BUL	Stoyko Sakaliev
23	MF	BUL	Emil Gargorov
24	FW	BUL	Kostadin Hazurov
25	DF	BUL	Ivan Ivanov
26	MF	BUL	Petko Iliev
27	DF	BRA	Tiago Silva
29	DF	SEN	Ibrahima Gueye
30	DF	BUL	Yordan Todorov
31	GK	MDA	Evgheni Hmaruc
31	FW	BUL	Miroslav Manolov
—	MF	SEN	Mansour Ayanda

== Competitions ==
=== A Group ===
==== Table ====
Pos	Team	Pld	W	D	L	GF	GA	GD	Pts	Qualification or relegation
1	CSKA Sofia (C)	30	25	4	1	81	16	+65	79	Qualification for Champions League second qualifying round
2	Levski Sofia	30	24	4	2	76	19	+57	76	Qualification for UEFA Cup second qualifying round
3	Lokomotiv Plovdiv	30	18	4	8	65	34	+31	58	Qualification for UEFA Cup second qualifying round
4	Litex Lovech	30	16	4	10	45	27	+18	52	Qualification for UEFA Cup second qualifying round
5	Slavia Sofia	30	13	9	8	43	33	+10	48	

Source: A PFG (in Bulgarian)
Rules for classification: 1st points; 2nd head-to-head points; 3rd head-to-head goal difference; 4th head-to-head goals scored; 5th head-to-head away goals scored; 6th goal difference; 7th goals scored; 8th "sportsmanship" (R & Y cards); 9th draw
(C) Champions

==== Results summary ====
Overall								Home						Away					
Pld	W	D	L	GF	GA	GD	Pts	W	D	L	GF	GA	GD	W	D	L	GF	GA	GD
30	25	4	1	81	16	+65	79	13	2	0	46	6	+40	12	2	1	35	10	+25

Last updated: 28 May 2005.
Source: Soccerway

==== Results by round ====
Round	1	2	3	4	5	6	7	8	9	10	11	12	13	14	15	16	17	18	19	20	21	22	23	24	25	26	27	28	29	30
Ground	A	A	H	A	H	A	H	A	H	A	H	A	H	A	H	H	H	A	H	A	H	A	H	A	H	A	H	A	H	A
Result	W	W	W	W	W	W	W	W	D	W	W	D	W	W	D	W	W	W	W	D	W	W	W	W	W	W	W	W	W	L
Position	6	2	1	1	1	1	1	1	1	1	1	1	1	1	1	1	1	1	1	1	1	1	1	1	1	1	1	1	1	1

Source: CSKA Sofia league results
W = Win; D = Draw; L = Loss

==== Fixtures and results ====
6 August 2004 1	Rodopa	0–1	CSKA	Smolyan
18:00			Zabavník 45+2'	Stadium: Septemvri; Attendance: 5,000; Referee: Tsvetan Georgiev

14 August 2004 2	Slavia	1–4	CSKA	Sofia
18:00	Valkanov 67'		Yanev 26'; Dimitrov 57' (pen.); Sakaliev 80'; E. Yordanov 90+3'	Stadium: Slavia; Attendance: 2,500; Referee: Anton Genov

21 August 2004 3	CSKA	5–0	Nesebar	Sofia
19:30	Mujiri 10'; Hazurov 23', 79'; Gargorov 68'; Yanev 72'			Stadium: Balgarska Armiya; Attendance: 2,000; Referee: Dimcho Radev

29 August 2004 4	Naftex	0–4	CSKA	Burgas
20:15			Yanev 3', 74'; Dimitrov 22'; Mujiri 55'	Stadium: Lazur; Attendance: 9,000; Referee: Momchil Vraykov

10 September 2004 5	CSKA	6–0	Spartak Varna	Sofia
19:00	Yanev 44', 58', 81'; Dimitrov 45+3' (pen.), 89'; Mujiri (red card) 53'; Sakaliev 57'		Filatov (red card) 53'; Sofroniev (red card) 66'	Stadium: Balgarska Armiya; Attendance: 2,000; Referee: Lachezar Yonev

19 September 2004 6	Beroe	1–3	CSKA	Stara Zagora
15:00	Kwakye 34'; Spahiev (red card) 90'		Yanev 51'; Zakov 69'; Hazurov 80'	Stadium: Beroe; Attendance: 12,500; Referee: Tsvetan Georgiev

25 September 2004 7	CSKA	5–1	Lokomotiv Sofia	Sofia
19:00	Gargorov 4', 39'; Mujiri 7'; Todorov 18'; Hazurov 71'		Genkov 62'	Stadium: Balgarska Armiya; Attendance: 2,000; Referee: Dimitar Dimitrov

3 October 2004 8	Cherno More	1–2	CSKA	Varna
15:00	Simov 76'		Sakaliev 40'; Todorov 80'	Stadium: Ticha; Attendance: 6,000; Referee: Galin Moskalev

17 October 2004 9	CSKA	2–2	Levski	Sofia
19:00	Sakaliev 10'; Yanev 45+2' (pen.)		Telkiyski 51'; Borimirov 59'; Topuzakov (red card) 78'	Stadium: Vasil Levski; Attendance: 13,500; Referee: Anton Genov

24 October 2004 10	Vidima-Rakovski	0–4	CSKA	Sevlievo
16:00	Y. Yordanov (red card) 12'		Mujiri 5'; Gargorov 25', 45'; E. Yordanov 80'	Stadium: Rakovski; Attendance: 4,000; Referee: Momchil Vraykov

31 October 2004 11	CSKA	3–1	Litex	Sofia
17:00	Todorov 14' (pen.); Charras 57'; Yanev 90'		Joãozinho 33'	Stadium: Balgarska Armiya; Attendance: 4,000; Referee: Tsvetan Georgiev

7 November 2004 12	Marek	2–2	CSKA	Dupnitsa
15:15	Rumenov 13', 15'		Gargorov 18'; Hazurov 54'	Stadium: Bonchuk; Attendance: 5,000; Referee: Galin Moskalev

13 November 2004 13	CSKA	2–0	Belasitsa	Sofia
14:30	Yanev 16', 57'		Junivan (penalty missed) 21'	Stadium: Balgarska Armiya; Attendance: 1,000; Referee: Petar Stoyanov

20 November 2004 14	Pirin Blagoevgrad	0–3	CSKA	Blagoevgrad
13:30			Dafkov 19' (o.g.); Sakaliev 45'; Zabavník 58'	Stadium: Hristo Botev; Attendance: 4,500; Referee: Momchil Vraykov

27 November 2004 15	CSKA	0–0	Lokomotiv Plovdiv	Sofia
14:30				Stadium: Balgarska Armiya; Attendance: 6,000; Referee: Dimitar Dimitrov

27 February 2005 16	CSKA	1–0	Rodopa	Sofia
14:00	E. Yordanov 16'			Stadium: Balgarska Armiya; Attendance: 2,000; Referee: Ahmed Ahmed

5 March 2005 17	CSKA	4–0	Slavia	Sofia
15:30	E. Yordanov 20'; Yanev 27', 36'; Gueye 28'		Mechedzhiev (red card) 69'	Stadium: Balgarska Armiya; Attendance: 5,500; Referee: Momchil Vraykov

12 March 2005 18	Nesebar	0–2	CSKA	Nesebar
15:00	Baychev (red card) 49'		Todorov 80'; Zabavník 84'	Stadium: Gradski; Attendance: 1,000; Referee: Kostadin Kostadinov

19 March 2005 19	CSKA	3–0	Naftex	Sofia
16:00	Yanev 30', 74'; Zabavník 90'		Hristov (red card) 45+1'	Stadium: Balgarska Armiya; Attendance: 3,000; Referee: Angel Bekyarov

3 April 2005 20	Spartak Varna	0–0	CSKA	Varna
15:00				Stadium: Spartak; Attendance: 2,000; Referee: Anton Genov

6 April 2005 21	CSKA	4–1	Beroe	Sofia
17:00	Todorov 21'; Zabavník 31'; Yanev 52'; Iliev 67'		Tonchev 90+2'	Stadium: Balgarska Armiya; Attendance: 2,000; Referee: Georgi Hadzhiyski

9 April 2005 22	Lokomotiv Sofia	0–1	CSKA	Sofia
17:00			E. Yordanov 7'	Stadium: Lokomotiv; Attendance: 6,500; Referee: Tsvetan Georgiev

17 April 2005 23	CSKA	1–0	Cherno More	Sofia
17:00	Yanev 63' (pen.)			Stadium: Balgarska Armiya; Attendance: 3,000; Referee: Krasimir Yosifov

23 April 2005 24	Levski	0–1	CSKA	Sofia
18:00			Yanev 76' (pen.)	Stadium: Vasil Levski; Attendance: 17,345; Referee: Momchil Vraykov

30 April 2005 25	CSKA	3–0	Vidima-Rakovski	Sofia
17:00	Iliev 18', 47'; Mujiri 84'			Stadium: Balgarska Armiya; Attendance: 3,000; Referee: Nikolay Yordanov

7 May 2005 26	Litex	0–1	CSKA	Lovech
18:00			Iliev 64'	Stadium: Gradski; Attendance: 3,000; Referee: Tsvetan Georgiev

11 May 2005 27	CSKA	5–0	Marek	Sofia
18:00	Yanev 8' (pen.); Zabavník 29'; E. Yordanov 33'; Yanchev 37'; Gargorov 83'			Stadium: Balgarska Armiya; Attendance: 3,500; Referee: Stefan Spasov

15 May 2005 28	Belasitsa	1–4	CSKA	Petrich
18:00	Daskalov 59'; Paparkov (red card) 73'		E. Yordanov 14', 34'; V. Ivanov 49' (o.g.); Gargorov 78'	Stadium: Tsar Samuil; Attendance: 6,000; Referee: Anton Genov

21 May 2005 29	CSKA	2–1	Pirin Blagoevgrad	Sofia
18:00	E. Yordanov 16'; Gargorov 77'		Georgiev 26'	Stadium: Balgarska Armiya; Attendance: 18,500; Referee: Momchil Vraykov

28 May 2005 30	Lokomotiv Plovdiv	4–3	CSKA	Plovdiv
17:30	Kamburov 43' (pen.); Jančevski 62', 70'; Hristev 87'		Hazurov 11'; Yanev 60', 68'	Stadium: Lokomotiv; Attendance: 3,500; Referee: Kostadin Kostadinov

=== Bulgarian Cup ===
27 October 2004 Second round	Shumen	0–3	CSKA	Shumen
15:00			E. Yordanov 39'; Gargorov 46'; Sakaliev 87'	Stadium: Panayot Volov; Attendance: 7,000; Referee: Kostadin Kostadinov

10 November 2004 Third round	Rilski Sportist	2–3 (a.e.t.)	CSKA	Samokov
14:00	Videnov 12'; Chalakov 82'		Sakaliev 23'; E. Yordanov 45'; Hazurov 104'	Stadium: Iskar; Attendance: 2,000; Referee: Dimcho Radev

16 March 2005 Quarter-final	Hebar	0–1	CSKA	Pazardzhik
15:00			E. Yordanov 2'	Stadium: Georgi Benkovski; Attendance: 10,000; Referee: Dimcho Radev

13 April 2005 Semi-final Leg 1	Pirin 1922	0–2	CSKA	Blagoevgrad
17:00			Yanchev 44'; Cauet 80'	Stadium: Hristo Botev; Attendance: 5,000; Referee: Hristo Ristoskov

3 May 2005 Semi-final Leg 2	CSKA	3–3 (5–3 agg.)	Pirin 1922	Sofia
17:30	Hazurov 12'; Zakov 63', 72'		Nikolov 39'; Mitsanski 65'; Pavlov 89'	Stadium: Balgarska Armiya; Attendance: 700; Referee: Georgi Ignatov

25 May 2005 Final	Levski	2–1	CSKA	Sofia
18:00	Borimirov 52'; Domovchiyski 76'		Yanev 82' (pen.)	Stadium: Vasil Levski; Attendance: 10,848; Referee: Anton Genov (Gabrovo)

=== UEFA Cup ===
==== Second qualifying round ====
10 August 2004 First leg	Omonia (Cyprus)	1–1	(Bulgaria) CSKA	Nicosia, Cyprus
19:00	Kožlej 57'		Mujiri 79'	Stadium: GSP Stadium; Attendance: 17,000; Referee: Paul Mckeon (Republic of Ireland)

26 August 2004 Second leg	CSKA (Bulgaria)	3–1 (a.e.t.) (4–2 agg.)	(Cyprus) Omonia	Sofia, Bulgaria
20:30	Mujiri 90+3'; Sakaliev 111'; Hazurov 116'		Stjepanović 78'	Stadium: Balgarska Armiya; Attendance: 13,000; Referee: Drago Kos (Slovenia)

==== First round ====
16 September 2004 First leg	Steaua București (Romania)	2–1	(Bulgaria) CSKA	Bucharest, Romania
20:00	Neaga 9'; Dică 80'		Yanev 28'	Stadium: Ghencea Stadium; Attendance: 25,000; Referee: Olegário Benquerença (Portugal)

30 September 2004 Second leg	CSKA (Bulgaria)	2–2 (3–4 agg.)	(Romania) Steaua București	Sofia, Bulgaria
17:00	Sakaliev 45'; Gargorov 75'		Oprița 14'; Paraschiv 34'	Stadium: Balgarska Armiya; Attendance: 20,000; Referee: Espen Berntsen (Norway)
