= 2004 Bulgarian Cup final =

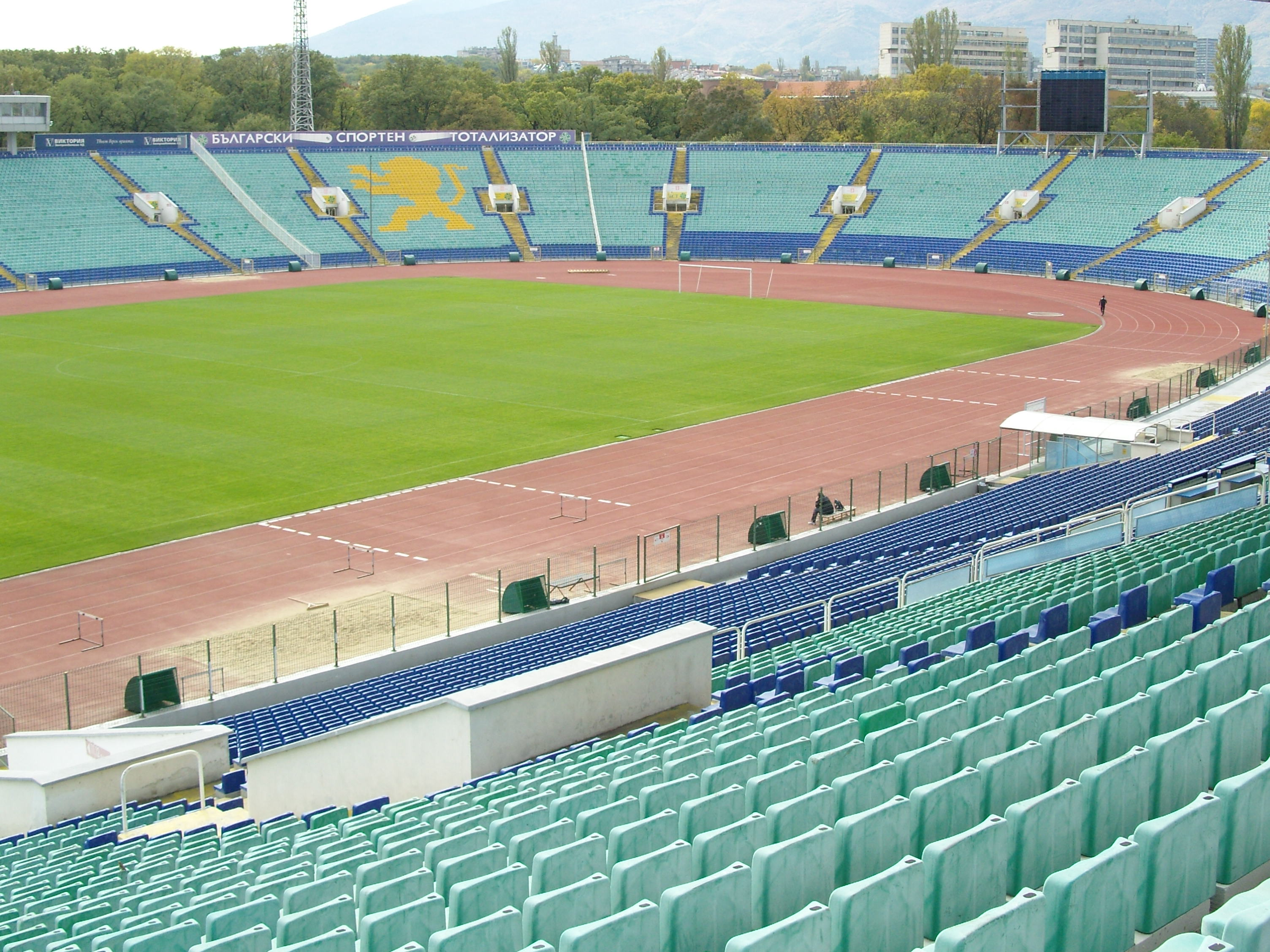
- Event: 2003–04 Bulgarian Cup
Litex	CSKA
A Group	A Group
2	2
- Litex won 6–5 on penalties
- Date: 12 May 2004
- Venue: Vasil Levski National Stadium, Sofia
- Man of the Match: Mourad Hdiouad
- Referee: Hristo Ristoskov
- Attendance: 11,461

The 2004 Bulgarian Cup final was played at the Vasil Levski National Stadium in Sofia on 12 May 2004 and was contested between the sides of Litex Lovech and CSKA Sofia. The match was won by Litex Lovech.

== Match ==
=== Details ===
12 May 2004
17:30 EEST

Litex Lovech	2–2	CSKA Sofia
Zhelev 38'; Hdiouad 85'		João Carlos 57'; Gargorov 72'
Penalties
Trică (penalty scored); Zhelev (penalty scored); Jelenković (penalty missed); Dimitrov (penalty missed); Dzhambazov (penalty scored); Bachev (penalty missed); Hdiouad (penalty scored)	6–5	(penalty scored) Petrov; (penalty scored) Dimitrov; (penalty scored) Charras; (penalty missed) Yanchev; (penalty missed) Kolev; (penalty missed) Sakaliev; (penalty missed) Gueye

Vasil Levski Stadium, Sofia
Attendance: 11,461
Referee: Hristo Ristoskov (Sandanski)

Litex	CSKA

Litex:
GK	30	(Bulgaria) Zdravko Zdravkov
DF	2	(Bulgaria) Stanislav Bachev
DF	3	(Bulgaria) Zhivko Zhelev
DF	17	(Bulgaria) Zlatomir Zagorčić (substituted off) 68'
DF	6	(Bulgaria) Rosen Kirilov (c) (yellow card)
MF	23	(Serbia and Montenegro) Nebojša Jelenković
MF	27	(Brazil) Tiago Silva (red card)
MF	32	(Togo) Paul Adado (substituted off) 46'
MF	18	(Morocco) Mourad Hdiouad
FW	16	(Bulgaria) Desislav Rusev (yellow card) (substituted off) 61'
FW	21	(Romania) Eugen Trică
Substitutes:
DF	5	(Bulgaria) Kostadin Dzhambazov (substituted in) 68'
DF	13	(Bulgaria) Nikolay Dimitrov (substituted in) 46'
MF	15	(Bulgaria) Angel Rusev (substituted in) 61'
Manager:
(Serbia and Montenegro) Ljupko Petrović Assistant referees: (Bulgaria) Nikola Dzhuganski (Bulgaria) Veselin Mishev

CSKA:
GK	12	(Bulgaria) Stoyan Kolev (yellow card)
DF	30	(Bulgaria) Yordan Todorov
DF	25	(Brazil) João Carlos
DF	4	(Argentina) Marcos Charras (yellow card)
DF	29	(Senegal) Ibrahima Gueye (yellow card)
MF	5	(Bulgaria) Todor Yanchev (c)
MF	7	(Bulgaria) Hristo Yanev (yellow card) (substituted off) 86'
MF	8	(Bulgaria) Velizar Dimitrov
MF	23	(Bulgaria) Emil Gargorov (substituted off) 96'
FW	19	(Bulgaria) Evgeni Yordanov (yellow card)
FW	24	(Bulgaria) Kostadin Hazurov (substituted off) 63'
Substitutes:
MF	14	(Bulgaria) Svetoslav Petrov (substituted in) 96'
MF	20	(Portugal) João Paulo Brito (substituted in) 86'
FW	21	(Bulgaria) Stoyko Sakaliev (substituted in) 63'
Manager:
(Bulgaria) Ferario Spasov

== See also ==
- 2003–04 A Group
