= 2002–03 A Group =

55th completed season of top-tier football league in Bulgaria

A Group
- Season: 2002–03
- Dates: 9 August 2002 – 31 May 2003
- Champions: CSKA Sofia (29th title)
- Relegated: Dobrudzha; Rilski Sportist
- Champions League: CSKA
- UEFA Cup: Levski; Litex
- Matches: 182
- Goals: 544 (2.99 per match)
- Top goalscorer: Georgi Chilikov (22 goals)

The 2002–03 A Group was the 55th season of the top Bulgarian national football league (commonly referred to as A Group) and the 79th edition of a Bulgarian national championship tournament.

== Overview ==
It was contested by 14 teams, and CSKA Sofia won the championship. The Reds finished with 66 points in total, six points above archrivals Levski Sofia. CSKA Sofia qualified for the 2003-04 Champions League qualifying rounds, while Levski and third placed Litex Lovech qualified for the UEFA Cup for next season. Marek Dupnitsa qualified for the Intertoto Cup.

At the end of the season, Dobrudzha Dobrich and Rilski Sportist were relegated after just one season in the elite. Only two teams were relegated, because the league was expanded the following season from 14 to 16 teams.

== Teams ==
=== Promotion and Relegation ===
Beroe, Belasitsa Petrich, and Spartak Pleven were relegated at the end of the last season. The relegated teams were replaced by three teams from B PFG. These teams were Botev Plovdiv, Dobrudzha Dobrich, and Rilski Sportist Samokov. Botev return after a one-year absence, Dobrudzha return after a two-year absence, while Rilski Sportist made their debut in the top tier of Bulgarian football.

=== Stadia and Locations ===
Location of teams in 2002–03 A Group
Sofia 2002–03 A Group football clubs

Team	City	Stadium	Capacity
Botev	Plovdiv	Hristo Botev	22,000
Cherno More	Varna	Ticha	12,000
Chernomorets	Burgas	Chernomorets	22,000
CSKA	Sofia	Balgarska Armia	22,015
Dobrudzha	Dobrich	Druzhba	12,500
Levski	Sofia	Georgi Asparuhov	29,986
Litex	Lovech	Lovech	7,050
Lokomotiv	Plovdiv	Lokomotiv (Plovdiv)	13,800
Lokomotiv	Sofia	Lokomotiv (Sofia)	22,000
Marek	Dupnitsa	Bonchuk Stadium	16,050
Naftex	Burgas	Lazur	18,037
Rilski Sportist	Samokov	Iskar	7,000
Slavia	Sofia	Ovcha Kupel	18,000
Spartak	Varna	Spartak Stadium	7,500

== League standings ==
Pos	Team	Pld	W	D	L	GF	GA	GD	Pts	Qualification or relegation
1	CSKA Sofia (C)	26	21	3	2	67	16	+51	66	Qualification for Champions League second qualifying round
2	Levski Sofia	26	19	3	4	61	19	+42	60	Qualification for UEFA Cup qualifying round
3	Litex Lovech	26	17	4	5	49	22	+27	55	Qualification for UEFA Cup qualifying round
4	Slavia Sofia	26	16	3	7	57	30	+27	51	
5	Cherno More	26	14	6	6	42	21	+21	48	
6	Lokomotiv Plovdiv (Note: Lokomotiv Plovdiv were docked three points for failure to show in the round 17 match.)	26	16	2	8	56	33	+23	47	
7	Spartak Varna	26	10	4	12	25	34	−9	34	
8	Naftex Burgas	26	10	3	13	31	36	−5	33	
9	Marek	26	8	6	12	35	42	−7	30	Qualification for Intertoto Cup first round
10	Lokomotiv Sofia	26	7	4	15	23	37	−14	25	
11	Chernomorets Burgas	26	7	3	16	32	56	−24	24	
12	Botev Plovdiv	26	6	3	17	26	61	−35	21	
13	Dobrudzha Dobrich (R)	26	4	2	20	19	73	−54	14	Relegation to 2003–04 B Group
14	Rilski Sportist (R)	26	1	6	19	20	63	−43	9	Relegation to 2003–04 B Group

Source: A PFG (in Bulgarian)
Rules for classification: 1st points; 2nd head-to-head points; 3rd head-to-head goal difference; 4th head-to-head goals scored; 5th head-to-head away goals scored; 6th season goal difference; 7th season goals scored; 8th "sportsmanship" (R & Y cards); 9th draw
(C) Champions; (R) Relegated

== Results ==
Home \ Away	BOT	CHB	CHM	CSK	DOB	LEV	LIT	LPL	LSO	MAR	NAF	RIL	SLA	SPV
Botev Plovdiv		0–0	0–1	1–5	5–1	0–3	0–2	1–2	3–0	1–0	1–1	2–1	1–4	1–1
Chernomorets Burgas	3–0		1–2	2–8	2–1	1–2	1–4	1–1	0–1	2–3	1–0	3–0	2–4	1–2
Cherno More	4–0	2–2		0–1	2–1	0–0	0–0	1–0	3–0	2–0	3–1	4–0	4–0	2–1
CSKA Sofia	2–0	4–1	1–2		3–0	3–0	1–0	1–0	2–0	5–2	5–2	2–0	3–1	3–1
Dobrudzha Dobrich	3–0	0–2	1–1	0–5		0–5	0–2	1–2	1–0	0–1	2–1	0–0	1–2	1–3
Levski Sofia	3–0	3–1	1–0	1–1	5–0		3–0	3–1	3–0	2–0	1–0	6–0	1–2	0–0
Litex Lovech	4–1	2–1	0–2	1–0	3–0	3–0		1–1	4–0	0–0	4–1	5–2	2–1	1–0
Lokomotiv Plovdiv	5–3	4–0	4–1	0–3 (Note: Match awarded after Lokomotiv Plovdiv did not show up due to the protest for a playing the match in Samokov.)	9–1	2–1	4–2		2–1	5–0	1–2	2–1	1–0	2–0
Lokomotiv Sofia	1–0	3–0	0–0	0–2	5–0	0–1	1–2	4–1		2–0	0–2	1–1	0–0	2–1
Marek	6–1	0–1	1–1	0–2	5–0	1–5	0–0	1–2	1–0		2–0	3–1	0–3	3–0
Naftex Burgas	1–2	2–0	2–1	0–1	3–2	0–1	1–3	2–0	2–0	1–1		0–0	3–2	1–0
Rilski Sportist	1–3	1–2	1–3	1–1	0–2	2–4	0–1	0–4	2–0	3–3	1–2		1–3	0–0
Slavia Sofia	5–0	3–1	1–0	0–2	6–1	2–5	1–0	2–0	1–1	1–1	2–1	5–0		4–0
Spartak Varna	2–0	3–0	2–1	1–1	1–0	0–2	0–2	0–1	2–1	2–1	1–0	2–1	0–3 (Note: Match awarded because Georgi Mechechiev and Anastas Petrov were ineligible to play for Spartak, match was originally finished 1–0 for the hosts.)	

Source: A PFG (in Bulgarian)
Legend: Blue = home team win; Yellow = draw; Red = away team win.

== Champions ==
CSKA Sofia

Goalkeepers
1	(Bulgaria) Ivaylo Ivanov	1	(0)
12	(Bulgaria) Stoyan Kolev	24	(0)

Defenders
2	(Bulgaria) Georgi Antonov	17	(0)
3	(Brazil) Fábio Lima	10	(0)
4	(Argentina) Marcos Charras	5	(1)
6	(Bulgaria) Aleksandar Tomash	16	(1)
13	(Bulgaria) Yordan Varbanov	4	(0)
25	(Brazil) João Carlos	24	(1)
29	(Senegal) Ibrahima Gueye	23	(0)
30	(Bulgaria) Yordan Todorov	10	(1)
	(Bulgaria) Galin Ivanov*	1	(0)

Midfielders
5	(Bulgaria) Todor Yanchev	23	(3)
7	(Bulgaria) Hristo Yanev	16	(1)
10	(Bulgaria) Metodi Deyanov*	5	(0)
11	(Bulgaria) Stoycho Mladenov, Jr.	1	(0)
14	(Bulgaria) Svetoslav Petrov	24	(3)
15	(North Macedonia) Artim Šakiri	20	(5)
17	(Bulgaria) Borislav Karamatev	1	(0)
20	(Portugal) João Paulo Brito	23	(8)
23	(Bulgaria) Emil Gargorov	24	(14)
26	(Bulgaria) Ivan Pavlov	1	(0)
27	(Bulgaria) Petar Zlatinov	4	(0)

Forwards
8	(Bulgaria) Velizar Dimitrov	24	(13)
9	(Brazil) Agnaldo	18	(5)
18	(Bulgaria) Gerasim Zakov	4	(0)
21	(South Africa) MacDonald Mukansi	23	(8)
24	(Bulgaria) Petar Nikolov	2	(0)

Manager
(Bulgaria) Stoycho Mladenov

- Ivanov and Deyanov left the club during a season.

== Top scorers ==
Rank	Scorer	Club	Goals
1	(Bulgaria) Georgi Chilikov	Levski Sofia	22
2	(Bulgaria) Martin Kushev	Slavia Sofia	17
3	(Bulgaria) Emil Gargorov	CSKA Sofia	14
4	(Bulgaria) Velizar Dimitrov	CSKA Sofia	13
5	(Bulgaria) Desislav Rusev	Litex Lovech	11
5	(Bulgaria) Georgi Vladimirov	Slavia Sofia	11
7	(Serbia and Montenegro) Velimir Ivanović	Slavia Sofia	9
7	(Bulgaria) Doncho Donev	Lokomotiv Plovdiv	9
7	(Bulgaria) Boyko Velichkov	Lokomotiv Sofia	9
7	(Bulgaria) Borislav Dimitrov	Botev Plovdiv	9
