= 2004–05 A Group =

57th completed season of top-tier football league in Bulgaria

A Group
- Season: 2004–05
- Dates: 6 August 2004 – 28 May 2005
- Champions: CSKA Sofia (30th title)
- Relegated: Vidima-Rakovski; Nesebar; Spartak Varna
- Champions League: CSKA Sofia
- UEFA Cup: Levski Sofia; Lokomotiv Plovdiv; Litex Lovech
- Matches: 240
- Goals: 638 (2.66 per match)
- Top goalscorer: Martin Kamburov (27 goals)
- Biggest home win: Levski 8–1 Belasitsa
- Biggest away win: Spartak 0–7 Levski
- Highest scoring: Levski 8–1 Belasitsa (9 goals)

The 2004–05 A Group was the 57th season of the top Bulgarian national football league (commonly referred to as A Group) and the 81st edition of a Bulgarian national championship tournament.

== Overview ==
It was contested by 16 teams, and CSKA Sofia won the championship.

== Teams ==
=== Promotion and Relegation ===
The league was contested by 16 teams, 13 returning from the previous season, as well as three teams promoted from the B Group. The promoted teams are Beroe Stara Zagora, Pirin Blagoevgrad, and Nesebar. Beroe return after a two-year absence, Pirin return after a four-year absence, while Nesebar made their debut in the top level of Bulgarian football.

=== Stadiums and Locations ===
Location of teams in 2004–05 A Group
Sofia 2004–05 A Group football clubs

Team	Location	Stadium	Capacity
Belasitsa	Petrich	Tsar Samuil	12,000
Beroe	Stara Zagora	Beroe	12,500
Cherno More	Varna	Ticha	8,250
CSKA	Sofia	Balgarska Armia	22,015
Levski	Sofia	Georgi Asparuhov	29,200
Litex	Lovech	Gradski (Lovech)	7,050
Lokomotiv	Plovdiv	Lokomotiv (Plovdiv)	20,000
Lokomotiv	Sofia	Lokomotiv (Sofia)	17,500
Marek	Dupnitsa	Bonchuk	12,500
Naftex	Burgas	Lazur	18,037
Nesebar	Nesebar	Gradski (Nesebar)	5,500
Pirin	Blagoevgrad	Hristo Botev	15,000
Rodopa	Smolyan	Septemvri	6,000
Slavia	Sofia	Slavia	32,000
Spartak	Varna	Spartak	7,500
Vidima-Rakovski	Sevlievo	Rakovski	6,000

== League table ==
Pos	Team	Pld	W	D	L	GF	GA	GD	Pts	Qualification or relegation
1	CSKA Sofia (C)	30	25	4	1	81	16	+65	79	Qualification for Champions League second qualifying round
2	Levski Sofia	30	24	4	2	76	19	+57	76	Qualification for UEFA Cup second qualifying round
3	Lokomotiv Plovdiv	30	18	4	8	65	34	+31	58	Qualification for UEFA Cup second qualifying round
4	Litex Lovech	30	16	4	10	45	27	+18	52	Qualification for UEFA Cup second qualifying round
5	Slavia Sofia	30	13	9	8	43	33	+10	48	
6	Lokomotiv Sofia (Note: Lokomotiv Sofia were docked three points for failure to pay salaries to a former player.)	30	14	7	9	43	35	+8	46	
7	Naftex Burgas	30	10	5	15	24	38	−14	35 (Note: Naftex Burgas ahead of Cherno More, Marek and Beroe on head-to-head points; Naftex Burgas: 10 pts, Cherno More: 9 pts, Marek: 9 pts, Beroe: 7 pts.)	
8	Cherno More	30	10	5	15	30	38	−8	35	
9	Marek	30	9	8	13	34	44	−10	35	
10	Beroe	30	9	8	13	32	36	−4	35	
11	Belasitsa Petrich	30	9	7	14	25	48	−23	34	
12	Rodopa Smolyan	30	9	6	15	33	43	−10	33 (Note: Rodopa Smolyan ahead of Pirin Blagoevgrad on head-to-head away goals scored; Rodopa Smolyan–Pirin Blagoevgrad 2–0, Pirin Blagoevgrad–Rodopa Smolyan 4–2.)	
13	Pirin Blagoevgrad	30	7	12	11	31	40	−9	33	
14	Vidima-Rakovski (R)	30	9	5	16	32	51	−19	32	Relegation to 2005–06 B Group
15	Nesebar (R)	30	5	5	20	26	63	−37	20	Relegation to 2005–06 B Group
16	Spartak Varna (R)	30	5	3	22	18	73	−55	18	Relegation to 2005–06 B Group

Source: A PFG (in Bulgarian)
Rules for classification: 1st points; 2nd head-to-head points; 3rd head-to-head goal difference; 4th head-to-head goals scored; 5th head-to-head away goals scored; 6th goal difference; 7th goals scored; 8th "sportsmanship" (R & Y cards); 9th draw
(C) Champions; (R) Relegated

== Results ==
Home \ Away	BEL	BSZ	CHM	CSK	LEV	LIT	LPL	LSO	MAR	NAF	NES	PRN	RDP	SPV	SLA	VRA
Belasitsa Petrich		1–1	0–0	1–4	0–1	1–0	2–1	1–0	0–0	2–0	3–0	0–0	1–0	4–0	0–0	1–0
Beroe	2–0		2–0	1–3	0–1	1–1	2–1	2–1	1–0	1–1	0–0	0–0	4–0	1–0	2–0	2–1
Cherno More	3–0	1–0		1–2	0–0	1–3	2–0	0–1	3–2	2–0	2–1	1–1	1–0	1–0	1–1	1–0
CSKA Sofia	2–0	4–1	1–0		2–2	3–1	0–0	5–1	5–0	3–0	5–0	2–1	1–0	6–0	4–0	3–0
Levski Sofia	8–1	3–1	2–1	0–1		0–1	2–1	5–0	3–2	4–1	2–0	4–0	5–1	4–1	3–0	2–0
Litex Lovech	2–0	1–1	2–0	0–1	0–1		0–1	2–0	3–0	0–1	2–1	4–2	2–0	4–1	1–1	1–0
Lokomotiv Plovdiv	3–0	3–0	2–0	4–3	2–2	4–3		4–0	3–0	1–0	4–1	4–4	4–0	5–0	1–0	4–0
Lokomotiv Sofia	5–1	2–1	2–1	0–1	0–0	2–1	2–0		4–2	1–0	0–0	0–0	2–1	3–1	1–0	5–2
Marek	1–0	1–0	2–1	2–2	0–1	0–1	1–0	1–1		2–1	4–1	2–1	2–1	4–1	0–2	2–2
Naftex Burgas	3–0	1–0	2–1	0–4	0–2	1–0	1–1	0–0	2–1		1–2	0–1	0–0	5–1	0–2	2–0
Nesebar	2–3	2–1	1–1	0–2	2–3	0–3	1–2	0–4	1–1	0–0		1–0	2–0	1–0	1–4	1–2
Pirin Blagoevgrad	1–1	0–0	3–0	0–3	0–1	1–0	1–4	0–0	1–1	0–1	3–1		4–2	2–0	2–2	1–1
Rodopa Smolyan	3–1	2–1	2–3	0–1	1–2	0–1	4–2	1–1	0–0	1–0	3–1	2–0		4–0	0–0	1–1
Spartak Varna	1–0	2–2	1–0	0–0	0–7	0–2	0–2	0–5	1–0	0–1	2–1	1–2	0–1		0–0	3–2
Slavia Sofia	4–0	3–2	3–1	1–4	0–2	2–2	2–0	1–0	0–0	3–0	4–1	0–0	1–3	2–1		4–1
Vidima-Rakovski	1–1	1–0	2–1	0–4	1–4	1–2	1–2	2–0	2–1	3–0	2–1	2–0	0–0	2–1	0–1	

Source: A PFG (in Bulgarian)
Legend: Blue = home team win; Yellow = draw; Red = away team win.

== Champions ==
CSKA Sofia

Goalkeepers
1	(Bulgaria) Ivaylo Ivanov	11	(0)
12	(Bulgaria) Hristo Bahtarliev	0	(0)
31	(Moldova) Evgheni Hmaruc	19	(0)

Defenders
2	(Slovakia) Radoslav Zabavník	29	(6)
3	(Bulgaria) Adalbert Zafirov	13	(0)
4	(Argentina) Marcos Charras*	6	(1)
11	(Czech Republic) Robert Caha	8	(0)
13	(Bulgaria) Yordan Varbanov	11	(0)
14	(Bulgaria) Valentin Iliev	18	(4)
25	(Bulgaria) Ivan Ivanov	1	(0)
27	(Brazil) Tiago Silva	15	(0)
29	(Senegal) Ibrahima Gueye	23	(1)
30	(Bulgaria) Yordan Todorov	28	(5)

Midfielders
5	(Bulgaria) Todor Yanchev	26	(1)
7	(Bulgaria) Hristo Yanev	29	(22)
10	(Georgia (country)) Amiran Mujiri	28	(5)
15	(France) Benoît Cauet	15	(0)
17	(Estonia) Joel Lindpere	11	(0)
20	(Bulgaria) Yordan Yurukov	10	(0)
23	(Bulgaria) Emil Gargorov	22	(9)
26	(Bulgaria) Petko Iliev	2	(0)
	(Senegal) Mansour Ayanda*	8	(0)

Forwards
8	(Bulgaria) Velizar Dimitrov	10	(4)
9	(Bulgaria) Ivan Ploshtakov	3	(0)
18	(Bulgaria) Gerasim Zakov	10	(1)
19	(Bulgaria) Evgeni Yordanov	23	(10)
21	(Bulgaria) Stoyko Sakaliev*	13	(5)
31	(Bulgaria) Miroslav Manolov*	1	(0)

Manager
(Serbia and Montenegro) Miodrag Ješić

- Charras, Ayanda, Sakaliev and Manolov left the club during a season.

== Top scorers ==
Rank	Scorer	Club	Goals
1	(Bulgaria) Martin Kamburov	Lokomotiv Plovdiv	27
2	(Bulgaria) Hristo Yanev	CSKA Sofia	22
3	(Bulgaria) Vladislav Zlatinov	Pirin Blagoevgrad	14
4	(Bulgaria) Tsvetan Genkov	Lokomotiv Sofia	12
5	(Bulgaria) Emil Angelov	Levski Sofia	11
5	(Romania) Eugen Trică	Litex Lovech	11
5	(Bulgaria) Blagoy Georgiev	Slavia Sofia	11
5	(Bulgaria) Dimitar Telkiyski	Levski Sofia	11
5	(Bulgaria) Plamen Timnev	Cherno More Varna	11
10	(Democratic Republic of the Congo) Masena Moke	Beroe Stara Zagora	10
10	(Bulgaria) Daniel Borimirov	Levski Sofia	10
10	(Bulgaria) Evgeni Yordanov	CSKA Sofia	10

== Attendances ==
#	Club	Average
1	CSKA Sofia	4,813
2	Beroe	4,707
3	Levski	4,295
4	Pirin	4,287
5	Rodopa	4,107
6	Lokomotiv Plovdiv	3,960
7	Cherno More	3,313
8	Belasitsa	2,547
9	Neftochimik	2,200
10	Marek	2,077
11	Lovech	1,920
12	Vidima-Rakovski	1,887
13	Spartak Varna	1,433
14	Slavia Sofia	1,200
15	Lokomotiv Sofia	910
16	Nesebar	551
