= Paranacity =

Coordinates: 22°54′S 52°09′W

- Municipality
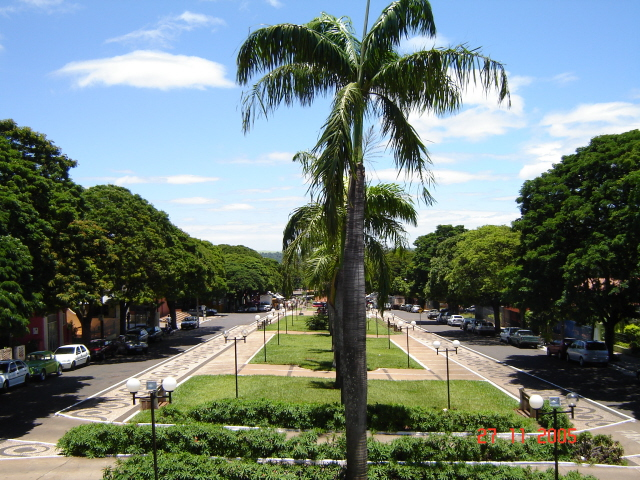

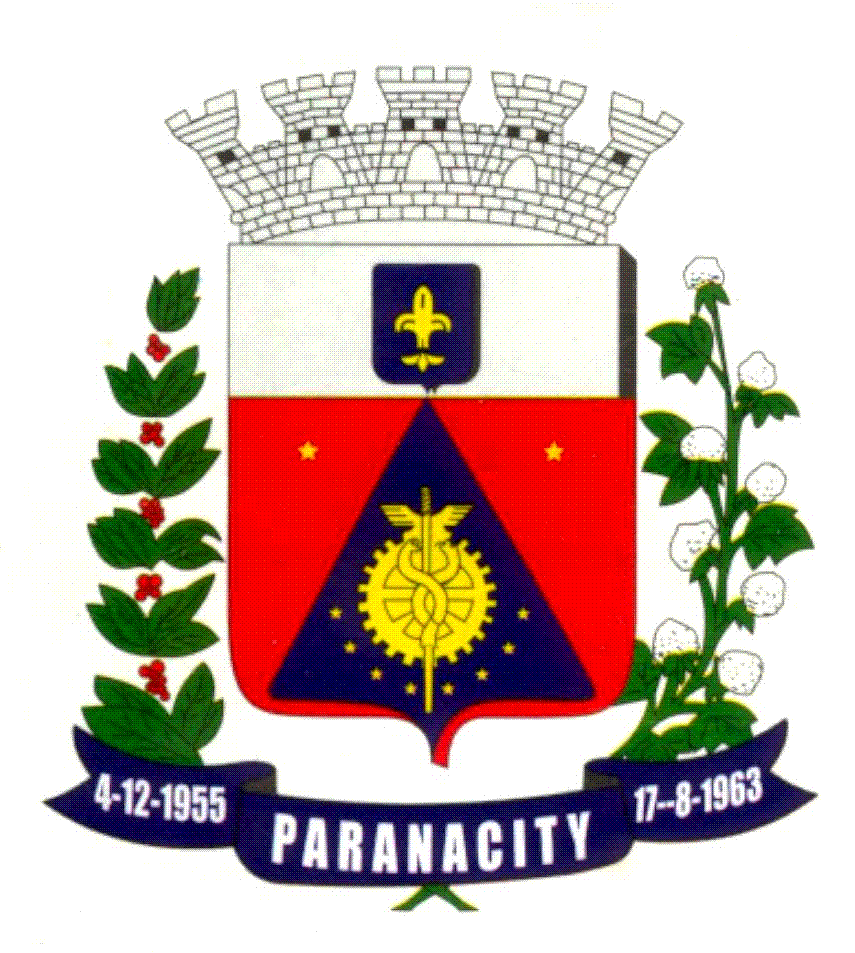
- Flag Coat of arms
- Interactive map of Paranacity
- Country: Brazil
- Region: Southern
- State: Paraná
- Mesoregion: Noroeste Paranaense

Population (2020)
  - Total: 11,580
- Time zone: UTC−3 (BRT)

Paranacity is a municipality in the state of Paraná in the Southern Region of Brazil.

== See also ==
- List of municipalities in Paraná
