= Agnaldo (footballer, born 1975) =

Brazilian footballer (born 1975)

Personal information
- Full name: Agnaldo Cordeiro Pereira
- Date of birth: January 25, 1975 (age 51)
- Place of birth: Paranacity, Paraná, Brazil
- Height: 1.80 m (5 ft 11 in)
- Position: Forward

Youth career
- 1992–1994: Londrina

Senior career*
Years	Team	Apps	(Gls)
1994–1995	Anderlecht		
1995	Londrina		
1996	América (SP)		
1996	Vitória (BA)		
1997	Corinthians		
1998	Vitória (BA)		
1999	Grêmio		
2000–2002	Fluminense	32	(11)
2002–2003	CSKA Sofia	18	(5)
2003	Anyang LG Cheetahs	17	(5)
2004	Portuguesa (SP)		
2004	Fortaleza		
2005	Brasiliense		
2005	Figueirense		
2006	Nacional (PR)		
2007	Marcílio Dias		
2007	Nacional de Patos		
- * Club domestic league appearances and goals

Agnaldo Cordeiro Pereira, shortly Agnaldo (born January 25, 1975) is a Brazilian former professional footballer who played as a forward.

== Career ==
Agnaldo was born in Paranacity, Paraná.

In August 2002 he signed a one-year contract (with the option for a two-year extension) with CSKA Sofia in the A PFG. He also played for Anyang LG Cheetahs of the South Korean K League.

== Honours ==
- Campeonato Paranaense in 1992 with Londrina
- Belgian League in 1994-95 with R.S.C. Anderlecht
- Campeonato Baiano in 1996, 1997 with Vitória
- Campeonato do Nordeste in 1997 with Vitória
- Campeonato Gaúcho in 1999 with Grêmio
- Copa Sul-Minas in 1999 with Grêmio
- Campeonato Carioca in 2002 with Fluminense
- Campeonato Cearense in 2004 with Fortaleza
