= Georgi Daskalov =

Bulgarian footballer

Personal information
- Full name: Georgi Ivanov Daskalov
- Date of birth: 3 August 1981 (age 45)
- Place of birth: Blagoevgrad, Bulgaria
- Height: 1.88 m (6 ft 2 in)
- Position: Striker

Team information
- Current team: Germanea
- Number: 19

Senior career*
Years	Team	Apps	(Gls)
1999–2004	Pirin Blagoevgrad	97	(17)
2004–2006	Belasitsa Petrich	57	(11)
2007	Velbazhd Kyustendil	19	(6)
2008–2011	Irtysh Pavlodar	67	(30)
2009	→ Zhetysu (loan)	11	(2)
2012	Aktobe	7	(0)
2012–2013	Pirin Blagoevgrad	12	(7)
2015–	Germanea	18	(3)
- * Club domestic league appearances and goals as of 1 February 2016

Georgi Daskalov (Bulgarian: Георги Даскалов; born 3 August 1981) is a Bulgarian footballer who currently plays for Germanea Sapareva Banya as a striker.

His first club was Pirin Blagoevgrad. He has also played for Belasitsa Petrich and Velbazhd Kyustendil.
