= Anton Evtimov =

Bulgarian former footballer (born 1973)

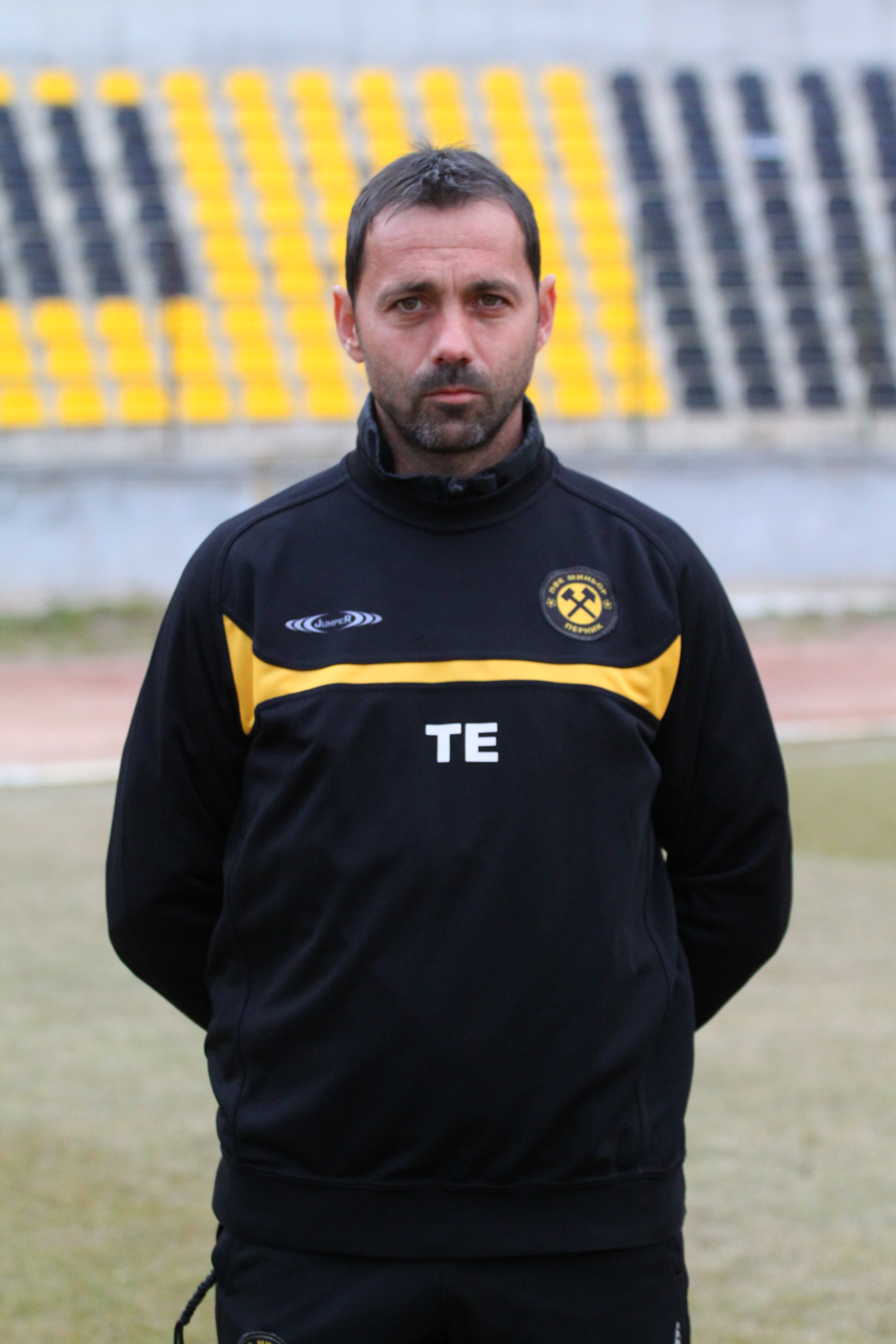

Personal information
- Full name: Anton Ivanov Evtimov
- Date of birth: 27 June 1973 (age 53)
- Place of birth: Pernik, Bulgaria
- Height: 1.75 m (5 ft 9 in)
- Position: Forward

Senior career*
Years	Team	Apps	(Gls)
1991–1998	Minyor Pernik	195	(35)
1998–1999	Lokomotiv Sofia	7	(1)
1999–2000	Minyor Pernik	28	(13)
2000	Lokomotiv Sofia	11	(1)
2001	Minyor Pernik	7	(1)
2001–2002	Marek Dupnitsa	33	(4)
2003–2004	Makedonska slava	34	(6)
2004–2008	Minyor Pernik	65	(21)
2008–2009	Strumska Slava	?	(?)
2009–2010	Minyor Pernik	1	(0)

International career
1999	Bulgaria	1	(0)
- * Club domestic league appearances and goals as of 30 June 2009

Anton Evtimov (born 27 June 1973) is a Bulgarian former footballer. He is considered to be one of the greatest footballers in Minyor Pernik's history.

== Career ==
Born in Pernik, Evtimov started to play football in Minyor. Until the 2009-10 season, he played 191 matches for the club, scoring 62 goals. On 6 May 2000, Anton Evtimov scored a hat-trick against Minyor's biggest rivals Levski Sofia bringing the victory 3:2 for his team. Evtimov has also played for Lokomotiv Sofia, Marek Dupnitsa, Makedonska Slava and FC Strumska slava.

In June 2009, Minyor signed the 36-year-old footballer for the fourth time in his career. He also became a playing assistant-manager.
