= Petar Zlatkov =

Bulgarian footballer

Personal information
- Full name: Petar Zlatkov
- Date of birth: 3 May 1984 (age 42)
- Place of birth: Sofia, Bulgaria
- Height: 1.79 m (5 ft 10 1/2 in)
- Position: Forward

Team information
- Current team: Lokomotiv Mezdra
- Number: 11

Youth career
- Lokomotiv 101

Senior career*
Years	Team	Apps	(Gls)
2001–2002	CSKA Sofia	2	(0)
2002	→ Svetkavitsa (loan)	?	(?)
2003–2004	→ Makedonska slava (loan)	?	(?)
2004	Botev Vratsa	?	(?)
2005	Chavdar BS	12	(7)
2005–2009	Lokomotiv Mezdra	26	(9)
2009	Balkan Botevgrad	11	(0)
2010	Rilski Sportist	5	(0)
2010–2012	Lokomotiv Mezdra	31	(23)
2013	Neubau	8	(3)
2013–2014	Lokomotiv Mezdra	9	(3)
- * Club domestic league appearances and goals

Petar Zlatkov (Bulgarian: Петър Златков; born 3 May 1984) is a Bulgarian footballer who played as a forward.
