= Petar Stanev =

Bulgarian footballer

Personal information
- Full name: Petar Stanev
- Date of birth: 29 September 1976 (age 50)
- Place of birth: Plovdiv, Bulgaria
- Height: 1.77 m (5 ft 10 in)
- Position: Striker

Team information
- Current team: Dimitrovgrad
- Number: 10

Senior career*
Years	Team	Apps	(Gls)
1996–1999	Maritsa Plovdiv	?	(?)
1999–2000	Lokomotiv Sofia	6	(0)
2000–2003	Chernomorets Burgas	35	(5)
2003–2004	CSKA Sofia	3	(0)
2004–2006	Rodopa Smolyan	?	(?)
2006–2008	Akademik Sofia	47	(10)
2008–2009	Heartland F.C.		
2010–	Dimitrovgrad		
- * Club domestic league appearances and goals as of 1 December 2008

Petar Stanev (Bulgarian: Петър Станев; born 22 September 1975) is a Bulgarian footballer who plays for Dimitrovgrad. He is a central forward.

== Career ==
Stanev started his career playing football at his local club Maritsa. Then moving onwards to Lokomotiv Sofia, Chernomorets Burgas, CSKA Sofia and Akademik Sofia. In September 2008 he signed with Nigerian club Heartland F.C., Stanev featured in the second half of their pre-season friendly against Dolphins FC at the Sam Okwaraji Memorial Stadium in Orlu.

Heartland won 1-0 through an 87th-minute goal scored by Ikechukwu Ibeneghu, but Stanov was the cynosure of all eyes, clearly different from the other 21 players on the pitch because of his skin colour.

His nickname is "The Queen".
