= MacDonald Mukansi =

South African soccer player

Personal information
- Date of birth: 26 May 1975 (age 51)
- Place of birth: Boksburg, South Africa
- Height: 1.74 m (5 ft 8 1/2 in)
- Position: Winger

Senior career*
Years	Team	Apps	(Gls)
1996–1998	Jomo Cosmos	37	(4)
1998–1999	EN Paralimni	24	(12)
1999–2002	Lokomotiv Sofia	64	(15)
2002–2003	CSKA Sofia	23	(8)
2003–2004	Supersport United	20	(1)
2004	EN Paralimni	10	(2)
2005	Manning Rangers	9	(2)
2005	SKA-Energiya	21	(5)
2006	Pierikos	10	(2)
2006	AmaZulu	1	(0)
2007–2008	East Bengal	11	(1)
2008–2009	Bay United	10	(0)
Total		240	(52)

International career
2001–2003	South Africa	8	(0)
- * Club domestic league appearances and goals as of 22 June 2009

MacDonald "Scooter" Mukansi (born 26 May 1975 in Boksburg) is a former South African football player who played as a forward.

== Career ==
He played for a few clubs, including Jomo Cosmos, Paralimni, CSKA Sofia, Lokomotiv Sofia, and Manning Rangers. He then moved to India and joined East Bengal Club of Kolkata for the 2007–08 I-League season. Well-travelled former Bafana Bafana winger MacDonald 'Scooter' Mukansi has completed his move to Premiership rookies Bay United on a one-year deal after impressing during recent trials.

== International career ==
He played for the South Africa national football team and was a participant at the 2002 FIFA World Cup.
