= Stoyan Kolev =

Bulgarian footballer (born 1976)

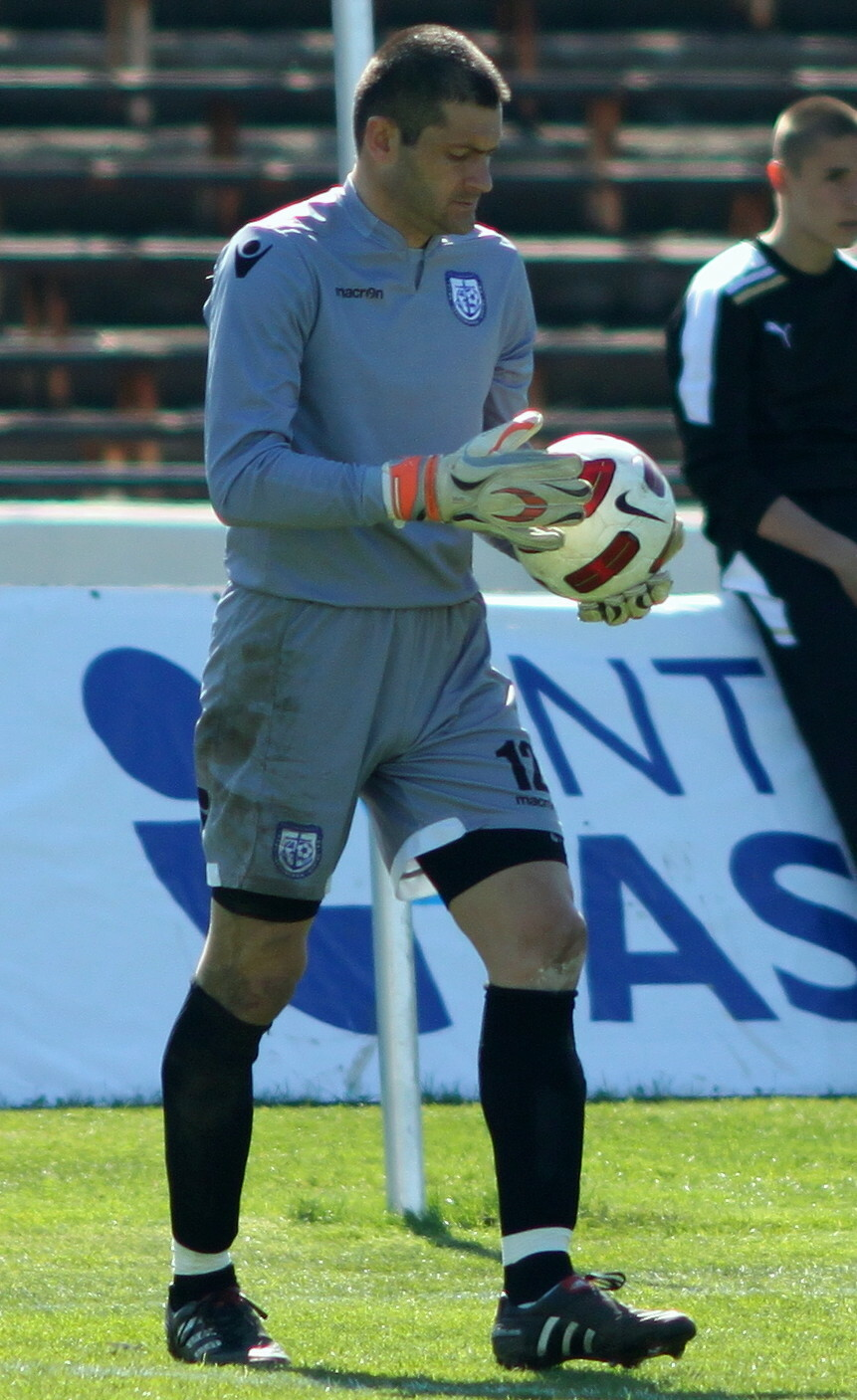
- Kolev with Chernomorets Burgas in 2012

Personal information
- Full name: Stoyan Kolev Petrov
- Date of birth: 3 February 1976 (age 50)
- Place of birth: Sliven, Bulgaria
- Height: 1.86 m (6 ft 1 in)
- Position: Goalkeeper

Team information
- Current team: Hebar Pazardzhik (goalkeeping coach)

Youth career
- 1983–1994: Sliven

Senior career*
| Years | Team | Apps | (Gls) |
| 1994–1997 | Sliven | ? | (?) |
| 1998–2001 | Lokomotiv Plovdiv | 37 | (0) |
| 2001–2004 | CSKA Sofia | 53 | (0) |
| 2001 | → Beroe (loan) | 2 | (0) |
| 2004–2008 | Lokomotiv Plovdiv | 81 | (0) |
| 2008–2010 | Oțelul Galați | 58 | (0) |
| 2010–2013 | Chernomorets Burgas | 66 | (0) |
| 2013–2014 | CSKA Sofia | 2 | (0) |
| 2015–2016 | CSKA Sofia | 17 | (0) |
| 2016 | Neftochimic Burgas | 4 | (0) |
| Total | | 320 | (0) |

International career
| 2002–2012 | Bulgaria | 16 | (0) |

Managerial career
- 2014–2015: CSKA Sofia (goalkeeping coach)
- 2017: Lokomotiv Plovdiv (goalkeeping coach)
- 2017: Lokomotiv Plovdiv (caretaker)
- 2019: Arda Kardzhali (goalkeeping coach)
- 2021–2024: CSKA Sofia (goalkeeping coach)
- 2025–: Hebar Pazardzhik (goalkeeping coach)
- 2025–: Bulgaria U21 (goalkeeping coach)
- * Club domestic league appearances and goals

Stoyan Kolev Petrov (Bulgarian: Стоян Колев Петров; born 3 February 1976) is a Bulgarian former professional footballer who played as a goalkeeper. He is the goalkeeping coach of Bulgarian club CSKA Sofia.

== Career ==
Kolev was born in Sliven. In summer of 2001 he joined CSKA Sofia and was loaned to Beroe Stara Zagora on a three-month deal. He made his debut for Beroe on 10 November 2001, keeping a clean sheet in a 0–0 draw against Levski Sofia. In early 2002 he returned to CSKA. On 11 May 2002, Kolev made his first appearance for CSKA in a 0–2 loss against Slavia Sofia. He started 2002–03 season as the first choice goalkeeper in CSKA and kept a total of 13 clean sheets in 24 appearances and conceding only 14 goals at less than a goal a game as CSKA won their 29th A PFG title.

After staying for two years with Romanian side Oțelul Galați, Kolev signed a two-and-a-half-year contract with Chernomorets Burgas on 24 February 2010, moving on a free transfer. As a goalkeeper for Chernomorets, he became a second choice goalkeeper behind Pascal Borel. After being named on the bench for Chernomorets's eleven games of the 2009–10 season, Kolev finally made his debut at home against Slavia Sofia on 2 May in a 2–2 league draw.

In the first half of the following season Kolev failed to make a single appearance in the A PFG, after he was named on the bench for all 15 league matches. On 4 December 2011, Kolev scored a penalty against Botev Plovdiv in a match of the Bulgarian Cup, but it proved to be a consolation, as Chernomorets lost 2–1 at Hristo Botev Stadium. On 23 December, he was named the A PFG Goalkeeper of the Year by journalists. He left Chernomorets Burgas on 16 June 2013.

In July 2013, Kolev signed with CSKA Sofia. On 15 March 2014, he made a rare appearance in the Eternal derby of Bulgarian football against Levski Sofia, keeping a clean sheet in the 1–0 win. He joined the coaching staff following his subsequent retirement.

In July 2015, several months later, after CSKA Sofia was sent to the third division due to the bad financial situation in the team, Kolev came out of retirement and went back on the field. He started as the first choice goalkeeper in the league, while Anatoli Gospodinov plays in the cup matches. In the first 9 matches in the V Group, he kept clean sheets.

== International career ==
Kolev was first called up to the Bulgaria squad at the age of 26. He made his debut for Plamen Markov's Bulgaria in a friendly against Spain on 20 November 2002, when he was a CSKA Sofia player, coming on as a second-half substitute during 0–1 defeat at Los Cármenes in Granada. Kolev was Bulgaria's third-choice goalkeeper, behind Zdravko Zdravkov and Dimitar Ivankov, at the UEFA Euro 2004, remaining an unused substitute in the tournament.

On 14 February 2012, Kolev was selected as goalkeeper for Lyuboslav Penev's first match in charge, a friendly against Hungary. On 29 February, he made a substitute appearance, replacing Nikolay Mihaylov on 63 minutes in a 1–1 draw. It was Kolev's first match for Bulgaria since the friendly with Bosnia and Herzegovina in August 2008.

== Career statistics ==
=== Club ===
As of 20 December 2016

Appearances and goals by club, season and competition
| Club | Season | Division | League | | Cup | | Europe | | Total | |
| Club | Season | Division | Apps | Goals | Apps | Goals | Apps | Goals | Apps | Goals |
|---|---|---|---|---|---|---|---|---|---|---|
| Lokomotiv Plovdiv | 1998–99 | A Group | 8 | 0 | 0 | 0 | — | | 8 | 0 |
| Lokomotiv Plovdiv | 1999–2000 | B Group | 24 | 0 | 0 | 0 | — | | 24 | 0 |
| Lokomotiv Plovdiv | 2000–01 | B Group | 29 | 0 | 0 | 0 | — | | 29 | 0 |
| Beroe (loan) | 2001–02 | A Group | 2 | 0 | 0 | 0 | — | | 2 | 0 |
| CSKA Sofia | 2001–02 | A Group | 3 | 0 | 0 | 0 | 0 | 0 | 3 | 0 |
| CSKA Sofia | 2002–03 | A Group | 24 | 0 | 6 | 0 | 4 | 0 | 34 | 0 |
| CSKA Sofia | 2003–04 | A Group | 26 | 0 | 7 | 0 | 6 | 0 | 39 | 0 |
| Lokomotiv Plovdiv | 2004–05 | A Group | 27 | 0 | 4 | 0 | 2 | 0 | 33 | 0 |
| Lokomotiv Plovdiv | 2005–06 | A Group | 19 | 0 | 0 | 0 | 4 | 0 | 23 | 0 |
| Lokomotiv Plovdiv | 2006–07 | A Group | 29 | 0 | 4 | 0 | 2 | 0 | 35 | 0 |
| Lokomotiv Plovdiv | 2007–08 | A Group | 6 | 0 | 1 | 0 | — | | 7 | 0 |
| Oțelul Galați | 2007–08 | Liga I | 15 | 0 | 0 | 0 | — | | 15 | 0 |
| Oțelul Galați | 2008–09 | Liga I | 32 | 0 | 0 | 0 | — | | 32 | 0 |
| Oțelul Galați | 2009–10 | Liga I | 11 | 0 | 0 | 0 | — | | 11 | 0 |
| Chernomorets Burgas | 2009–10 | A Group | 4 | 0 | 0 | 0 | — | | 3 | 0 |
| Chernomorets Burgas | 2010–11 | A Group | 10 | 0 | 0 | 0 | — | | 9 | 0 |
| Chernomorets Burgas | 2011–12 | A Group | 28 | 0 | 2 | 1 | — | | 30 | 1 |
| Chernomorets Burgas | 2012–13 | A Group | 24 | 0 | 3 | 0 | — | | 27 | 0 |
| CSKA Sofia | 2013–14 | A Group | 1 | 0 | 1 | 0 | 0 | 0 | 2 | 0 |
| CSKA Sofia | 2014–15 | A Group | 1 | 0 | 0 | 0 | 0 | 0 | 1 | 0 |
| CSKA Sofia | 2015–16 | V Group | 17 | 0 | 0 | 0 | – | | 17 | 0 |
| Neftochimic Burgas | 2016–17 | First Professional League | 4 | 0 | 1 | 0 | — | | 5 | 0 |
| Career total | | | 344 | 0 | 29 | 1 | 18 | 0 | 386 | 1 |

=== International ===
As of 14 November 2012

Appearances and goals by national team and year
| National team | Year | Apps | Goals |
|---|---|---|---|
| Bulgaria | 2002 | 1 | 0 |
| Bulgaria | 2003 | 3 | 0 |
| Bulgaria | 2004 | 1 | 0 |
| Bulgaria | 2005 | 3 | 0 |
| Bulgaria | 2006 | 3 | 0 |
| Bulgaria | 2008 | 1 | 0 |
| Bulgaria | 2012 | 4 | 0 |
| Total | | 16 | 0 |

== Honours ==
CSKA Sofia

- A Group: 2002-03
- V Group: 2015-16
- Bulgarian Cup: 2015-16

Lokomotiv Plovdiv

- Bulgarian Supercup: 2004
