= Svetoslav Petrov (footballer, born 1978) =

Bulgarian footballer

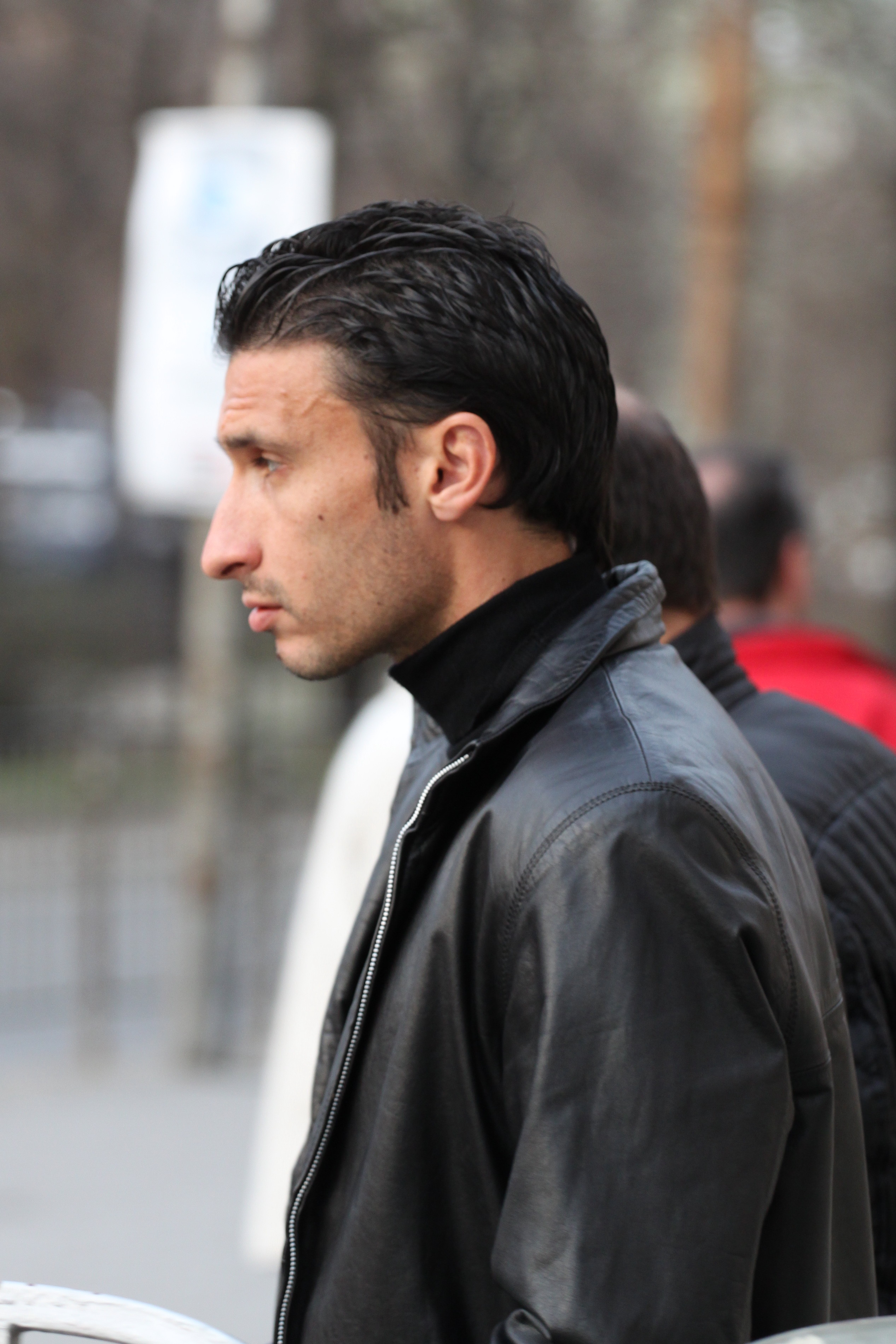
- Petrov in 2011

Personal information
- Full name: Svetoslav Stefanov Petrov
- Date of birth: 12 February 1978 (age 48)
- Place of birth: Dobrich, Bulgaria
- Height: 1.77 m (5 ft 9 1/2 in)
- Position: Midfielder

Youth career
- 1988–1996: Dobrudzha Dobrich

Senior career*
Years	Team	Apps	(Gls)
1996–1999	Dobrudzha Dobrich	60	(0)
2000–2004	CSKA Sofia	111	(12)
2004–2005	Kuban Krasnodar	32	(2)
2005	Lokomotiv Sofia	10	(0)
2006–2009	Neftchi Baku	44	(5)
2007	→ Changchun Yatai (loan)	16	(0)
2009–2010	CSKA Sofia	12	(0)
2010	Kaliakra Kavarna	8	(0)
2011–2012	Botev Plovdiv	3	(0)
2017–2018	Slivnishki Geroy		
Total		293	(19)

International career
2000–2003	Bulgaria	11	(0)

Managerial career
- 2011: CSKA Sofia (assistant)
- 2011–2012: Botev Plovdiv (assistant)
- 2016: Dobrudzha Dobrich (director)
- 2016–2017: Beroe Stara Zagora (director)
- 2019–2021: Dobrudzha Dobrich
- 2021: Lokomotiv Sofia (assistant)
- 2022–2023: Septemvri Sofia
- 2023–2024: Etar Veliko Tarnovo
- * Club domestic league appearances and goals

Svetoslav Stefanov Petrov (Bulgarian: Светослав Петров; born 12 February 1978) is a Bulgarian football manager and a former midfielder.

== Career ==
Petrov began his professional career at native club Dobrudzha Dobrich during 1996. In December 1999, he was sold to CSKA Sofia, with whom in 2002-03 season he became a champion of Bulgaria. This was the first of the three league titles to come for CSKA in the 2000s.

In 2004, Petrov was sold to Russian side Kuban Krasnodar for €500,000. He earned 32 appearances in the Russian Premier League and scored two goals, before a year later, he returned to Bulgaria, signing with Lokomotiv Sofia.

In January 2006 he resided in Azerbaijan and signed with local team Neftchi Baku. In 2007 Petrov spent a half season on loan at Chinese Super League side Changchun Yatai, and helped them win the 2007 league title.

In 2009, he returned to Bulgaria again and on 23 June 2009 he signed a 2-year contract with CSKA Sofia, where he remained until June 2010.

In June 2010 Petrov signed with Kaliakra Kavarna, playing eight games until his retirement in December 2010. He played his last game on 3 October 2010 at the Kavarna Stadium against Akademik Sofia.

== Coaching career ==
On 20 December 2010, Petrov was appointed as the assistant to the manager Milen Radukanov at CSKA Sofia.

== Personal life ==
Petrov is married to Virginia and they are the parents of a daughter, Stella, as well as a boy, Samuil, and a girl, Estel, who are twins.

== Honours ==
CSKA Sofia

- Bulgarian A PFG: 2002–03

Changchun

- Chinese Super League: 2007
