= Stoyko Sakaliev =

Bulgarian footballer

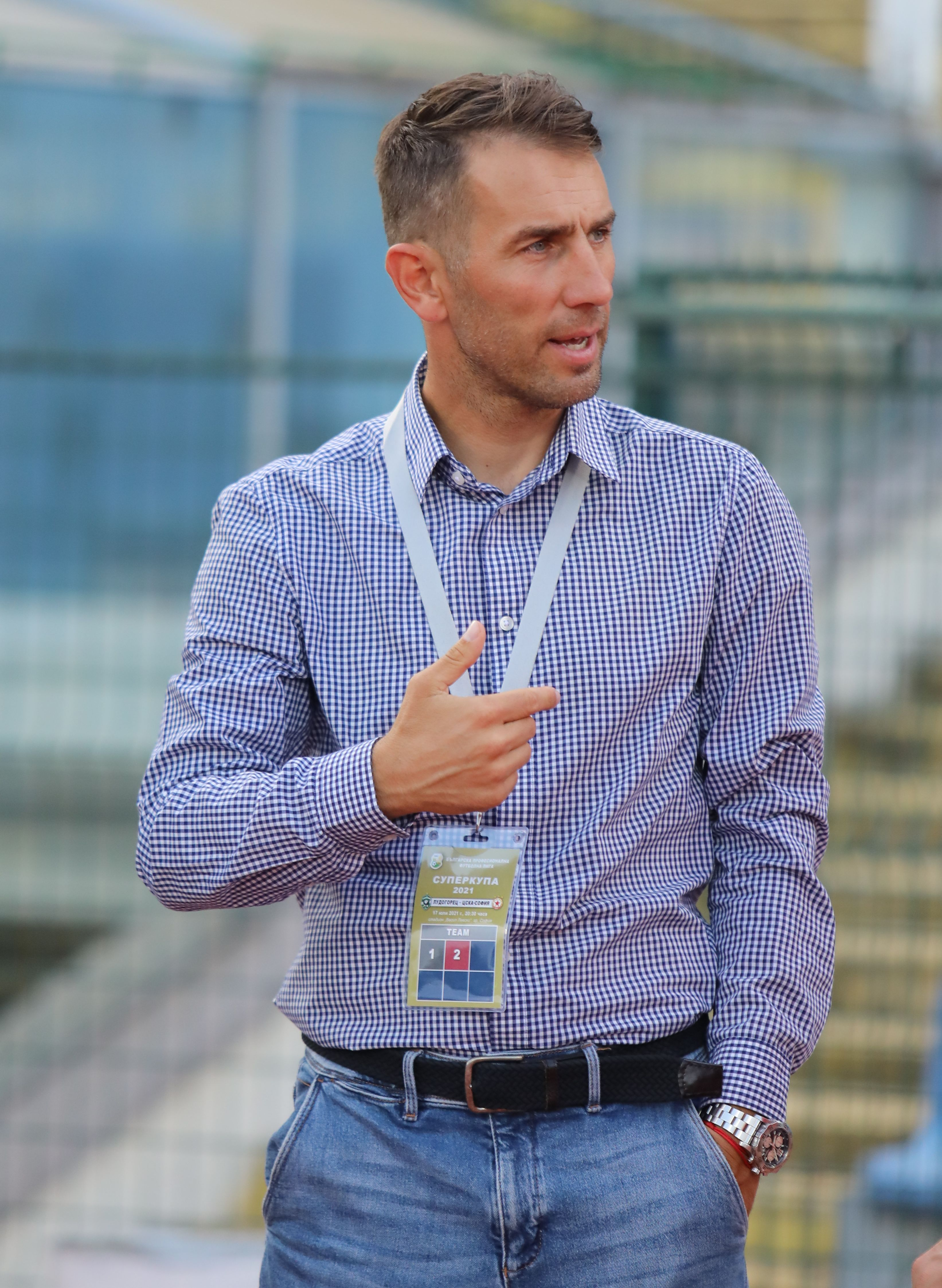

Personal information
- Full name: Stoyko Marinov Sakaliev
- Date of birth: 25 March 1979 (age 47)
- Place of birth: Sofia, Bulgaria
- Height: 1.80 m (5 ft 11 in)
- Position: Striker

Youth career
- 1990–1998: Naftex Burgas

Senior career*
Years	Team	Apps	(Gls)
1998–2005	Naftex Burgas	139	(48)
2004	→ CSKA Sofia (loan)	25	(12)
2005–2008	CSKA Sofia	22	(11)
2007–2008	→ Lokomotiv Plovdiv (loan)	13	(1)
2008–2009	Spartak Varna	24	(4)
2009–2010	Arka Gdynia	13	(0)
2010–2011	Akademik Sofia	18	(1)
2011–2012	Neftochimic 1986	22	(6)
2012–2013	Kerċem Ajax	11	(6)
2015–2016	Chernomorets 1919 Burgas	3	(3)
Total		287	(89)

International career
2004	Bulgaria	4	(0)
- * Club domestic league appearances and goals

Stoyko Marinov Sakaliev (Bulgarian: Стойко Маринов Сакалиев; born 25 March 1979) is a Bulgarian former professional footballer who played as a striker.

== Career ==
Sakaliev was born in Sofia. His first team was Naftex Burgas. He was first loaned to CSKA Sofia during 2004, but bought in the summer of 2005. He scored a goal against Steaua on 30 September 2004 in a UEFA Cup match. In 2007, for a period of six months, Stoyko was loaned out to Lokomotiv Plovdiv. In August 2008, he went to play for Spartak Varna. On 5 March 2011, Sakaliev scored a last-minute goal against Vidima Rakovski in an A PFG match. In the summer of 2011 Sakaliev signed contract with Eastern B group side Neftochimic 1962. On 17 September 2011 he scored twice from penalties as Neftochimic finished 2:2 with Botev Plovdiv. Sakaliev has just signed a contract with Kercem Ajax, playing in the first division on the island of Gozo, Malta. In late May 2013, Sakaliev announced his retirement from football.

== International career ==
In 2004 Stoyko Sakaliev played in four matches for Bulgaria national football team.

== Television ==
In 2013, he participated in VIP Brother Bulgaria.

== Personal life ==
Sakaliev was formerly married to Julvena Siderova and they have a daughter, named Liubomira Sakalieva.

He was known for his elaborate pranks on teammates and other public figures during his playing days.
