= João Paulo Brito =

Portuguese footballer (born 1974)

Personal information
- Full name: João Paulo Candeias Brito
- Date of birth: 5 June 1974 (age 52)
- Place of birth: Olhão, Portugal
- Height: 1.75 m (5 ft 9 in)
- Position: Winger

Youth career
- 1984–1989: Olhanense
- 1989–1990: Faro e Benfica
- 1990–1992: Penha

Senior career*
| Years | Team | Apps | (Gls) |
| 1992–1993 | Oriental Pechão | | |
| 1993–1994 | Beira-Mar Monte Gordo | | |
| 1994–1996 | Olhanense | 24 | (2) |
| 1996–1997 | Louletano | 26 | (10) |
| 1997–2001 | Belenenses | 105 | (14) |
| 2001–2002 | Estrela Amadora | 20 | (0) |
| 2002–2004 | CSKA Sofia | 45 | (10) |
| 2004 | Vitória Setúbal | 0 | (0) |
| 2005 | Kastoria | 10 | (1) |
| 2006–2007 | Jahn Regensburg | 0 | (0) |
| Total | | 230 | (37) |
- * Club domestic league appearances and goals

João Paulo Candeias Brito (born 5 June 1974) is a Portuguese retired professional footballer who played as a right winger.

== Career ==
Born in Olhão, Algarve, Brito began his professional career with hometown's S.C. Olhanense. He moved in 1996 to neighbours Louletano DC, as both clubs competed in the third division.

Brito experienced his best period in his country while at C.F. Os Belenenses: although not an undisputed starter he was an important attacking unit, appearing in more than 100 matches in the league alone (the Lisbon team spent the 1998–99 season in the second level). After four years he moved to another side in the capital, C.F. Estrela da Amadora, going scoreless in 20 matches as they finished fourth and narrowly missed out on promotion from division two.

In the following years, Brito all but played abroad, beginning in Bulgaria with PFC CSKA Sofia for which he appeared regularly, also acquiring Bulgarian citizenship. He also represented lowly Kastoria F.C. in Greece – after a few months at Vitória Setúbal without one single league appearance – and SSV Jahn Regensburg in Germany, before retiring as a professional in 2007 at the age of 33.

== Honours ==
Vitória Setúbal

- Taça de Portugal: 2004–05
