= Hristo Yanev =

Bulgarian footballer and manager

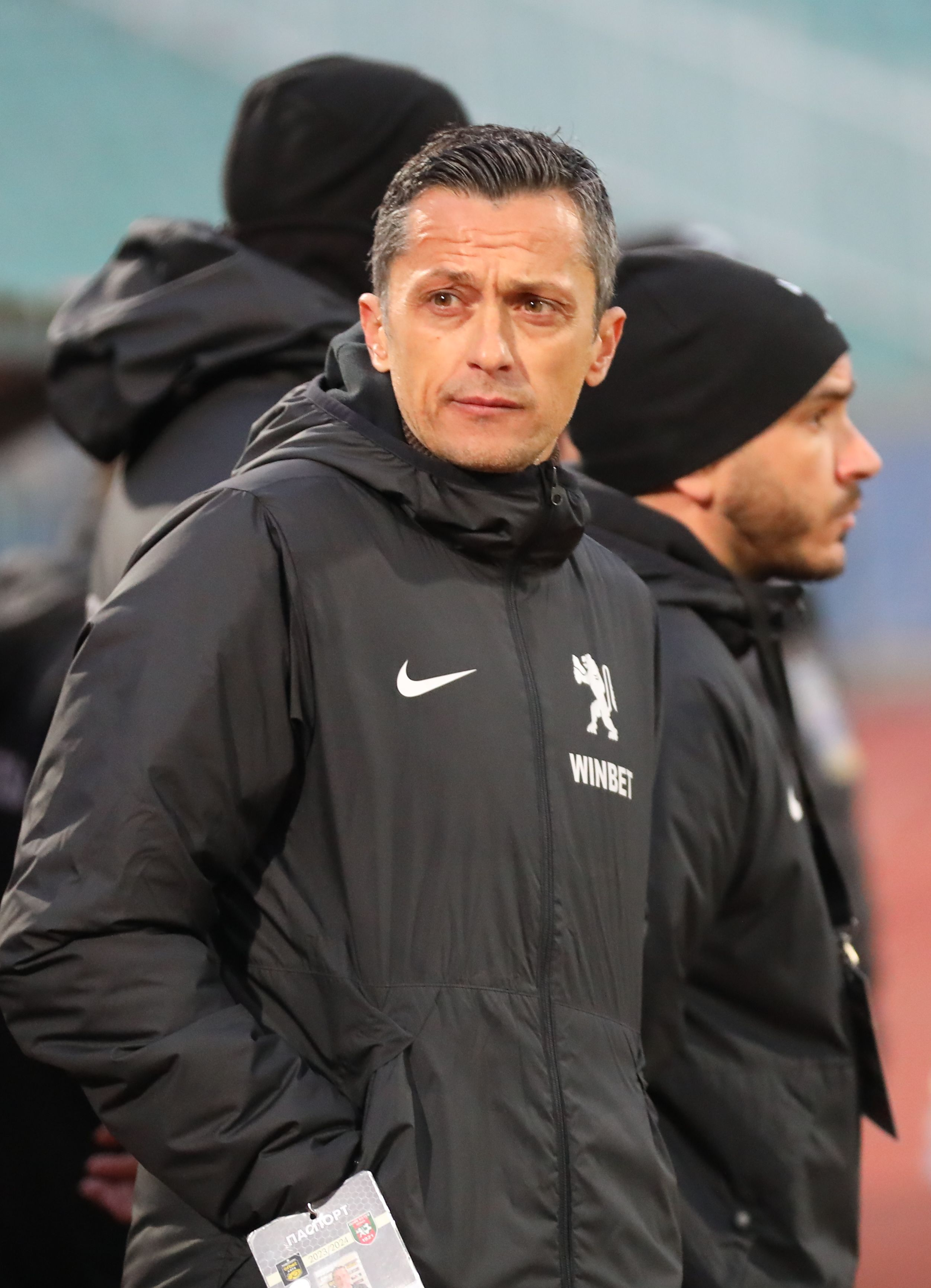
- Yanev in 2024 as Botev Vratsa manager

Personal information
- Full name: Hristo Angelov Yanev
- Date of birth: 4 May 1979 (age 47)
- Place of birth: Kazanlak, Bulgaria
- Height: 1.77 m (5 ft 10 in)
- Positions: Midfielder; second striker

Team information
- Current team: CSKA Sofia (manager)

Youth career
- Rozova Dolina

Senior career*
Years	Team	Apps	(Gls)
1997–1999	Olimpik Teteven	13	(1)
1999–2000	Beroe Stara Zagora	27	(7)
2000–2006	CSKA Sofia	146	(54)
2006–2009	Grenoble	50	(6)
2009–2012	Litex Lovech	78	(16)
2012	CSKA Sofia	2	(0)
2012–2013	Panetolikos	13	(0)
2013	Slavia Sofia	7	(0)
Total		336	(84)

International career
2004–2011	Bulgaria	11	(3)

Managerial career
- 2015: Minyor Pernik
- 2015–2016: CSKA Sofia
- 2016–2017: Neftochimic Burgas
- 2018–2020: CSKA Sofia (scout)
- 2020–2022: Minyor Pernik
- 2022–2023: Pirin Blagoevgrad
- 2023–2024: Botev Vratsa
- 2024–2025: Botev Vratsa
- 2025–2026: CSKA Sofia
- * Club domestic league appearances and goals

Hristo Yanev (Bulgarian: Христо Янев; born 4 May 1979) is a Bulgarian football manager and former player. Yanev played as a midfielder.

== Club career ==
=== Early years ===
Born in Kazanluk, Yanev was picked as a youth to play for local side Rozova Dolina, making his professional debut for Olimpik Teteven during the 1997–98 season. In 1999, he joined Beroe Stara Zagora, scoring 7 goals in 27 matches.

=== CSKA Sofia ===
After playing one season at Beroe, Yanev signed for CSKA Sofia in 2000, when he was only 20 years old and since then he has always played an important role in the team. Yanev plays either as a winger or second striker.

He made his competitive debut for CSKA on 4 August 2000 in a 0–0 home draw against Litex Lovech. On 25 August, Yanev scored his CSKA's first and first-ever UEFA Cup goal in an 8–0 drubbing of Moldovan Constructorul. Two days later, he scored his first league goal for CSKA in a 3–0 home win over Botev Plovdiv.

As a player of CSKA Yanev has been twice champion of Bulgaria (in 2003 and 2005) and has once won the Bulgarian national cup 2006. He spent six seasons of his career at the club, playing in 146 games of the A PFG and scoring 54 goals.

=== Grenoble ===
In summer of 2006, Grenoble signed Yanev to a three-year deal. For three years he made 50 appearances in league and scored six goals for Grenoble. With the club he played two seasons in Ligue 2 and one in Ligue 1.

=== Litex Lovech ===
On 25 June 2009, Yanev returned to Bulgaria, signing a three-year contract with Litex Lovech. He established himself as a key figure for the team from Lovech, helping them win the 2010 and 2011 A PFG titles. He left the club after the end of the 2011–12 season.

=== Return to CSKA Sofia ===
On 7 June 2012, Yanev signed a contract with former club CSKA Sofia. Yanev's second stay at CSKA turned out to be short-lived, as he was released from the club in the summer of 2012 following the team's elimination from the UEFA Europa League by Slovenian club Mura 05.

=== Panetolikos ===
On 12 September 2012, Yanev signed with Greek club Panetolikos. On 8 April 2013, he was released from the team.

=== Slavia Sofia ===
In the summer of 2013, he joined Slavia Sofia after having trained with the team for a number of weeks.

== International career ==
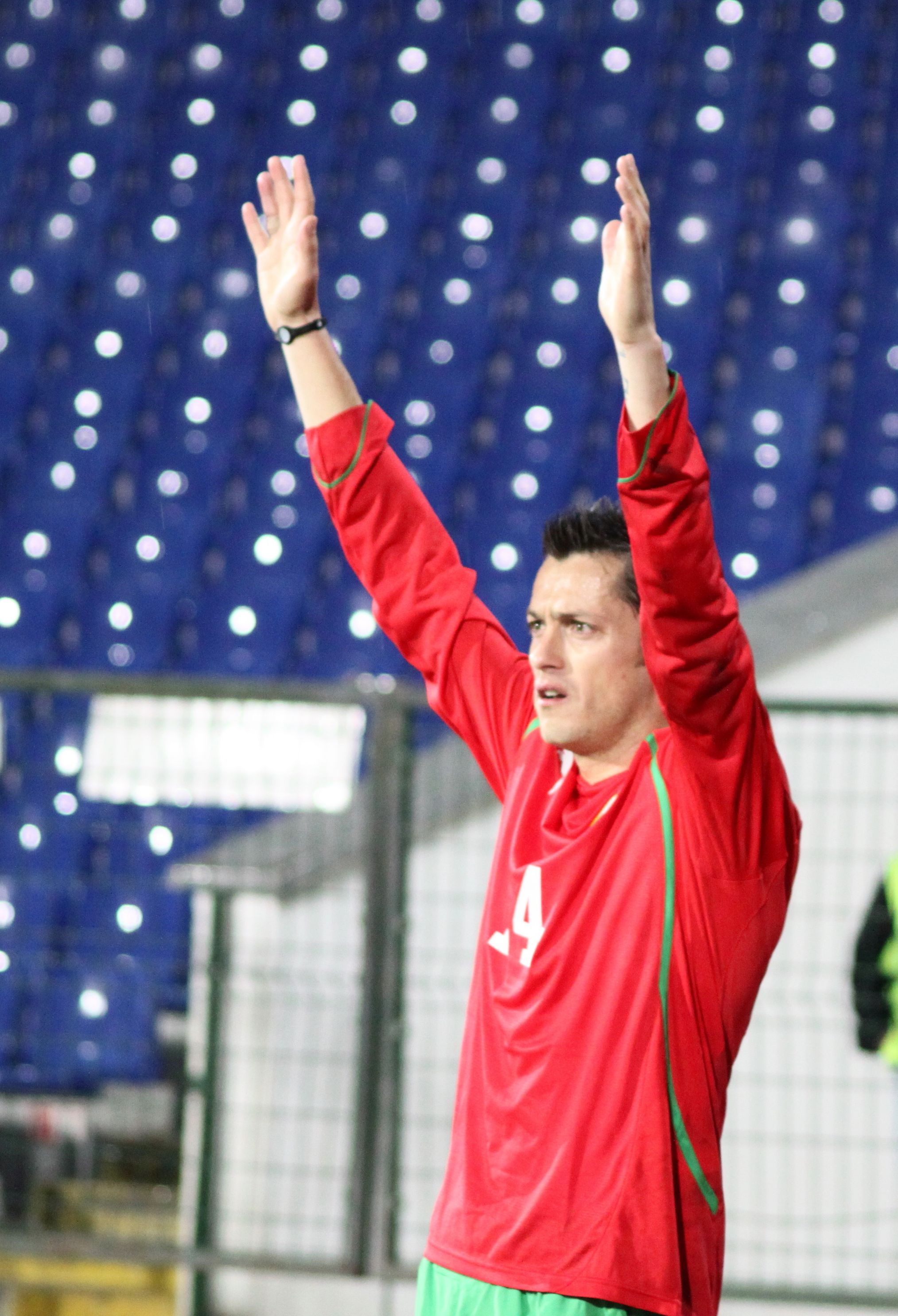
Yanev playing for Bulgaria in 2010

Yanev received his first call-up to the senior team in Hristo Stoichkov's first game in charge of Bulgaria in 2004. On 18 August he made his debut, replacing Marian Hristov as a second-half substitute in a 1–1 friendly draw against Ireland at Lansdowne Road Stadium. Two weeks later, on 4 September, Yanev scored his first international goal in a 3–1 win over Iceland in a 2006 World Cup qualifier. On 13 October, he scored the second goal in Bulgaria's 4–1 win over Malta in Sofia.

Two years later, on 9 May 2006, Yanev netted his third goal for the senior team as he scored the winning strike in a 2–1 victory over Japan in a game of the Kirin Cup.

== Coaching career ==
During the winter break of the 2014–15 season, Yanev was appointed head coach of Minyor Pernik, whom at that time were participating in the South-West V Group. He officially debuted his coaching career on 1 March 2015 at Minyor's thrashing 4–1 over Germanea Sapareva Banya.

In the summer of 2015, he was approached by the financially troubled CSKA Sofia, who were sent off to the V Group after the club's failure to obtain a license for the upcoming season in the first division. On 25 May 2016, he led CSKA Sofia to winning the 2015–16 Bulgarian Cup, becoming the first third-division club to record such an achievement.

On 17 September 2016, Yanev was appointed as manager of Neftochimic Burgas. He could not save the team from relegation and left the team in June 2017 after the final relegation play-off against Vitosha Bistritsa. Neftochimic's sporting director questioned his integrity and lack of responsibility.

== Playing statistics ==
=== Club ===
Appearances and goals by club, season and competition
Club	Season	League		Cup		Europe		Total	
Club	Season	Apps	Goals	Apps	Goals	Apps	Goals	Apps	Goals
Beroe Beroe Stara Zagora	1999–2000	27	7	2	0	–		29	7
CSKA Sofia	2000–01	26	12	3	1	4	2	33	15
CSKA Sofia	2001–02	25	5	6	3	3	0	34	8
CSKA Sofia	2002–03	16	1	6	0	3	0	25	1
CSKA Sofia	2003–04	28	11	8	7	4	0	40	18
CSKA Sofia	2004–05	29	22	2	1	4	1	35	24
CSKA Sofia	2005–06	22	3	5	1	8	1	35	5
CSKA Sofia	Total	146	54	30	13	25	4	201	71
Grenoble	2006–07	27	3			–		27	3
Grenoble	2007–08	21	3			–		21	3
Grenoble	2008–09	2	0			–		2	0
Grenoble	Total	50	6	0	0	0	0	50	6
Litex Lovech	2009–10	26	6	2	0	2	0	30	6
Litex Lovech	2010–11	27	5	4	0	6	0	37	5
Litex Lovech	2011–12	25	5	3	2	6	2	34	9
Litex Lovech	Total	78	16	9	2	14	2	101	20
CSKA Sofia	2012–13	0	0	0	0	2	0	2	0
Panetolikos	2012–13	13	0	0	0	−	−	13	0
Slavia Sofia	2013–14	7	0	1	0	−	−	8	0
Career total		321	83	42	15	41	6	404	104

=== Internaitonal ===
Scores and results list Bulgaria's goal tally first, score column indicates score after each Yanev goal.

List of international goals scored by Hristo Yanev
No.	Date	Venue	Opponent	Score	Result	Competition
1	4 September 2004	Reykjavík, Iceland	Iceland	3–1	3–1	2006 FIFA World Cup qualification
2	13 October 2004	Sofia, Bulgaria	Malta	2–1	4–1	2006 FIFA World Cup qualification
3	9 May 2006	Osaka, Japan	Japan	2–1	2–1	2006 Kirin Cup

== Managerial statistics ==
As of 9 September 2026

Team	From	To	Record							
Team	From	To	G	W	D	L	Win %	GF	GA	GD
Minyor Pernik	7 January 2015	25 June 2015	15	11	2	2	73.33	27	7	+20
CSKA Sofia	26 June 2015	21 August 2016	46	43	2	1	93.48	188	15	+173
Neftochimic Burgas	17 September 2016	2 June 2017	32	9	7	16	28.13	36	47	−11
CSKA Sofia (caretaker)	1 May 2018	20 May 2018	4	3	1	0	75.00	6	2	+4
Minyor Pernik	4 October 2020	14 September 2022	68	27	20	21	39.71	81	70	+11
Pirin Blagoevgrad	26 October 2022	17 June 2023	19	7	5	7	36.84	19	19	0
Botev Vratsa	19 September 2023	3 June 2024	28	9	6	13	32.14	38	48	−10
Botev Vratsa	6 September 2024	24 September 2025	45	13	12	20	28.89	39	61	-22
CSKA Sofia	24 September 2025	9 September 2026	49	30	10	9	61.22	78	42	+36
Total			306	152	65	89	49.67	511	310	+201

== Honours ==
=== Player ===
Litex Lovech

- Bulgarian A PFG: 2009–10, 2010–11
- Bulgarian Supercup: 2010

CSKA Sofia

- Bulgarian A PFG: 2002–03, 2004–05
- Bulgarian Cup: 2005–06

=== Manager ===
CSKA Sofia

- Bulgarian Cup: 2015–16, 2025–26
- Bulgarian Supercup: 2026
- V AFG: 2015–16
