= Velizar Dimitrov =

Bulgarian footballer

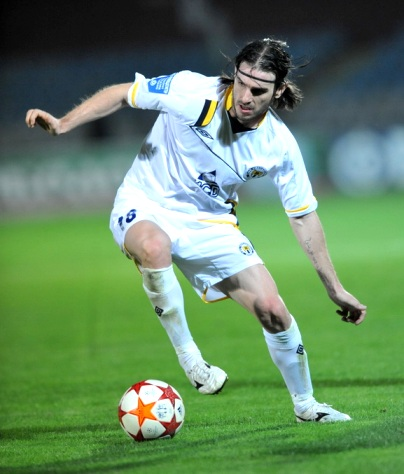
- Dimitrov with Metalurh Donetsk in 2011

Personal information
- Date of birth: 13 April 1979 (age 47)
- Place of birth: Pernik, Bulgaria
- Height: 1.76 m (5 ft 9 1/2 in)
- Position: Attacking midfielder

Youth career
- Minyor Pernik

Senior career*
Years	Team	Apps	(Gls)
1997–1998	Lokomotiv Sofia	3	(0)
1998–2000	Minyor Pernik	28	(6)
1999	→ Litex (loan)	0	(0)
2000	Lokomotiv Sofia	2	(0)
2001–2002	Marek Dupnitsa	43	(18)
2002–2008	CSKA Sofia	115	(36)
2008–2013	Metalurh Donetsk	108	(18)
Total		296	(78)

International career
2002–2010	Bulgaria	31	(3)

Managerial career
- 2014–2015: Metalurh Donetsk (Scout)
- 2016–2021: CSKA Sofia (Scout)
- * Club domestic league appearances and goals

Velizar Kostadinov Dimitrov (Bulgarian: Велизар Димитров; born 13 April 1979) is a Bulgarian former professional footballer who played as a midfielder.

Dimitrov previously played for Minyor Pernik, Lokomotiv Sofia, Marek Dupnitsa and CSKA Sofia, and was part of the Bulgarian UEFA Euro 2004 team. He has worked as a pundit since his retirement.

== Career ==
He joined CSKA Sofia in 2002, brought in the team by the manager Stoycho Mladenov..

In 2003, when Dimitrov won a number of individual awards as one of the best players in the A PFG, he was close to securing a move to FC Porto, but the deal eventually fell through due to financial reasons.

=== Metalurh Donetsk ===
On 11 June 2008, Dimitrov signed with Metalurh Donetsk on a 2+1-year deal for a reported fee of €500,000. He made his Ukrainian Premier League debut against Karpaty Lviv on 19 July, playing the full 90 minutes.

On 17 November 2012, he scored the only goal in a 1–0 victory over Dynamo Kyiv. He marked his 100th league appearance for Metalurh against Hoverla Uzhhorod on 20 April 2013, by scoring a winning goal for a 2–1 home win.

== International career ==
Dimitrov played for the league based national side in an unofficial friendly against Azerbaijan on 21 February 2002, scoring a goal for a 3–0 home win. He made his competitive debut for the national team in a 1–0 away loss against Spain on 20 November 2002, coming on as a second-half substitute. On 20 August 2003, Dimitrov opened his senior international goals tally, scoring twice for a 3–0 win over Lithuania.

He was included in the Bulgaria Euro 2004 squad in May 2004 by Plamen Markov and came on as a second-half substitute in Bulgaria's opening game against Sweden on 14 June. He was brought on once again in the match against Italy.

== Career statistics ==
=== Club ===
Appearances and goals by club, season and competition
Club	League	Season	League		Cup		Continental		Total	
Club	League	Season	Apps	Goals	Apps	Goals	Apps	Goals	Apps	Goals
Lokomotiv Sofia	A Group	1997–98	3	0	1	0	—		4	0
Minyor Pernik	A Group	1998–99	23	4	?	?	—		22	4
Litex (loan)	A Group	1999–00	0	0	0	0	2	0	2	0
Minyor Pernik	A Group	1999–00	5	2	?	?	—		5	2
Lokomotiv Sofia	A Group	2000–01	2	0	0	0	—		2	0
Marek Dupnitsa	B Group	2000–01	8	4	?	?	—		8	4
Marek Dupnitsa	A Group	2001–02	35	14	0	0	—		35	14
Marek Dupnitsa	Total		43	18	?	?	0	0	43	18
Career total			78	10	5	2	0	0	83	12

=== International goals ===
Scores and results list Bulgaria's goal tally first.

#	Date	Venue	Opponent	Score	Result	Competition
1	20 August 2003	Vasil Levski, Sofia, Bulgaria	Lithuania	2–0	3–0	Friendly
2	20 August 2003	Vasil Levski, Sofia, Bulgaria	Lithuania	3–0	3–0	Friendly
3	17 November 2007	Vasil Levski, Sofia, Bulgaria	Romania	1–0	1–0	Euro 2008 qualifier

== Honours ==
=== Club ===
CSKA Sofia

- A PFG: 2002–03, 2004–05, 2007–08
- Bulgarian Cup: 2005–06
- Bulgarian Supercup: 2006

Metalurh Donetsk

- Ukrainian Cup: Runner-up 2009–10, 2011–12
- Ukrainian Super Cup: Runner-up 2012
