= Ivaylo Ivanov (footballer, born 1974) =

Bulgarian footballer

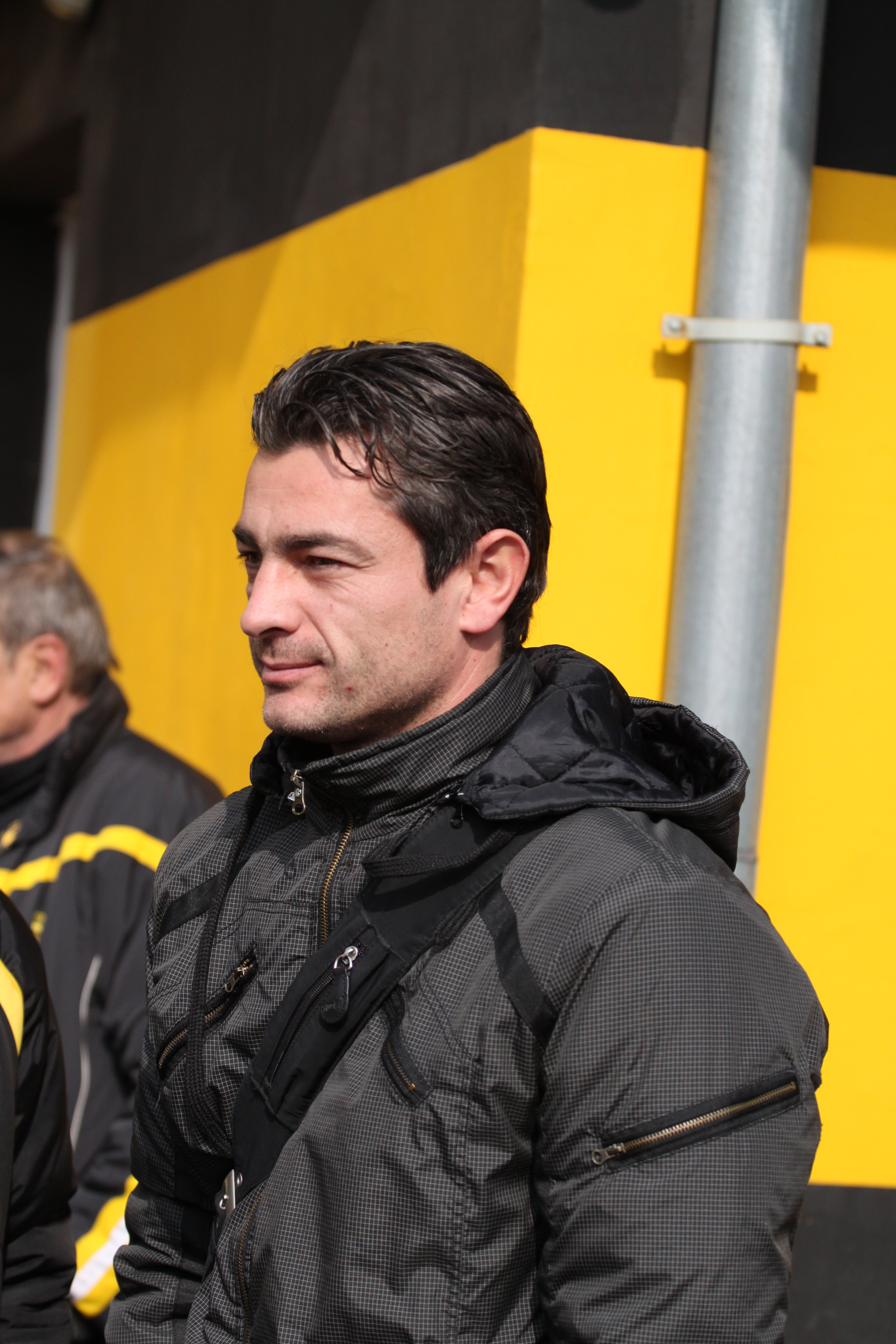

Personal information
- Full name: Ivaylo Dimitrov Ivanov
- Date of birth: 8 December 1974 (age 51)
- Place of birth: Sofia, Bulgaria
- Height: 1.84 m (6 ft 0 in)
- Position: Goalkeeper

Team information
- Current team: CSKA Sofia II (Goalkeeper Coach)

Youth career
- 1984–1993: CSKA Sofia

Senior career*
Years	Team	Apps	(Gls)
1993–2005	CSKA Sofia	83	(0)
2007–2008	Ilisiakos	8	(0)
2008–2011	Minyor Pernik	52	(0)
2011–2012	Beroe Stara Zagora	16	(0)
2013	Slavia Sofia	0	(0)
Total		159	(0)

Managerial career
- 2013–2014: Dobrudzha Dobrich (Goalkeeper Coach)
- 2015–2016: Litex Lovech (Goalkeeper Coach)
- 2017–2018: CSKA Sofia (Goalkeeper Coach)
- 2020–2021: CSKA Sofia (Goalkeeper Coach)
- 2021–2024: CSKA Sofia (Goalkeeper youth)
- 2024–2025: CSKA Sofia II (Goalkeeper Coach)
- 2025: CSKA Sofia (Goalkeeper Coach)
- 2025–: CSKA Sofia II (Goalkeeper Coach)
- * Club domestic league appearances and goals as of 3 June 1915

Ivaylo Dimitrov Ivanov (Bulgarian: Ивайло Иванов; born 8 December 1974) is a former Bulgarian football goalkeeper, who works as goalkeeper coach for youth team CSKA Sofia.

== Career ==
Ivaylo Ivanov is a product of CSKA Sofia's youth system. He made his debut in the first game of the 1998–99 season on 22 July 1998 in a 0–0 away draw against Belshina Bobruisk of the UEFA Cup, and did not lose his starting place to the end of the season. Ivanov earned 24 appearances in the A PFG, seven in the Bulgarian Cup, eight in the UEFA Cup and won the 1999 Bulgarian Cup.

In the next 1999–2000 season he became CSKA's second-choice goalkeeper, behind Todor Kyuchukov. During the season, he made just eight appearances for the club.

CSKA signed Nenad Lukić and Stoyan Kolev at the start of the 2001–02 season, and Lukić became the first choice goalkeeper. Second choice was Kolev with Ivanov slipping down to third.

In March 2013, he signed a contract with Slavia Sofia, but did no make any league appearances for the team.

== Club statistics ==
As of 15 December 2010

Club	Season	League		Cup		Europe		Total	
Club	Season	Apps	Goals	Apps	Goals	Apps	Goals	Apps	Goals
CSKA Sofia	1998–99	25	0	7	0	8	0	40	0
CSKA Sofia	1999–00	8	0	1	0	0	0	9	0
CSKA Sofia	2000–01	7	0	1	0	0	0	8	0
CSKA Sofia	2001–02	2	0	2	0	0	0	4	0
CSKA Sofia	2002–03	1	0	2	0	0	0	3	0
CSKA Sofia	2003–04	1	0	2	0	0	0	3	0
CSKA Sofia	2004–05	11	0	0	0	4	0	15	0
Ilisiakos	2007–08	8	0	0	0	0	0	8	0
Minyor Pernik	2008–09	16	0	3	0	0	0	19	0
Minyor Pernik	2009–10	24	0	2	0	0	0	26	0
Minyor Pernik	2010–11	12	0	2	0	0	0	14	0
Career totals		115	0	22	0	12	0	149	0
