= Ibrahima Gueye (footballer, born 1978) =

Senegalese footballer (born 1978)

Personal information
- Full name: Ibrahima Khoume Gueye
- Date of birth: 19 February 1978 (age 48)
- Place of birth: Pikine, Senegal
- Height: 1.90 m (6 ft 3 in)
- Position: Defender

Youth career
- Dakar UC

Senior career*
Years	Team	Apps	(Gls)
1996–2000	Dakar UC		
2000–2001	Douanes		
2001–2005	CSKA Sofia	161	(5)
2006	Samsunspor	9	(0)
2006–2008	Red Star Belgrade	57	(1)
2009	Al-Ahli Jeddah	7	(0)
2009–2013	Lokeren	68	(8)
2014	Radnički Niš	0	(0)
- * Club domestic league appearances and goals

Ibrahima Khoume Gueye (born 19 February 1978) is a Senegalese former professional footballer who played as a defender.

== Club career ==
Gueye started his professional playing career with Dakar UC in Senegal before joining another Senegalese club, AS Douanes. During the summer of 2001, he made his first entry into European football as he signed a contract with Bulgarian record title holder CSKA Sofia. Gueye won two national titles during his spell at CSKA Sofia, in 2003 and 2005.

Gueye was later transferred to Turkish Second Division side Samsunspor in February 2006, only to sign with Serbian club Red Star six months later. In the winter of 2009, he joined Al-Ahli Jeddah. After playing for Lokeren for 3 years, he signed a one-year contract with Serbian side Radnicki Niš.

== International career ==
He never played for Bulgaria despite some coaches expressing a wish to call him up to the European country's national team. Initially (in 2006) Gueye declined invitations to play for Bulgaria. In February 2008, he declared himself available and was called up for a friendly match against Finland, but was subsequently (before making a debut) found ineligible by FIFA due to his previous appearances for Senegal youth.

== Personal life ==
Gueye has dual Bulgarian and Senegalese citizenship. He has had 2 children with his ex-wife Fatou Touré. The oldest Marième Gueye (15 years old) and second son Jupiter Amadou Gueye (13). He divorced with Touré in 2016. He currently lives in Senegal and his children live in Belgium with their mother.

Following his retirement in 2014, Gueye has mainly been based in Belgium, but he regularly returns to Senegal. He has turned to business and owns a factory in Dakar that specializes in the production of mango juice, and is also engaged in animal husbandry.

== Honours ==
CSKA Sofia

- Bulgarian A PFG: 2002–03, 2004–05

Red Star Belgrade

- Serbian SuperLiga: 2006–07
- Serbian Cup: 2006–07

Lokeren

- Belgian Cup: 2011–12
