= João Carlos (footballer, born 1982) =

Brazilian footballer

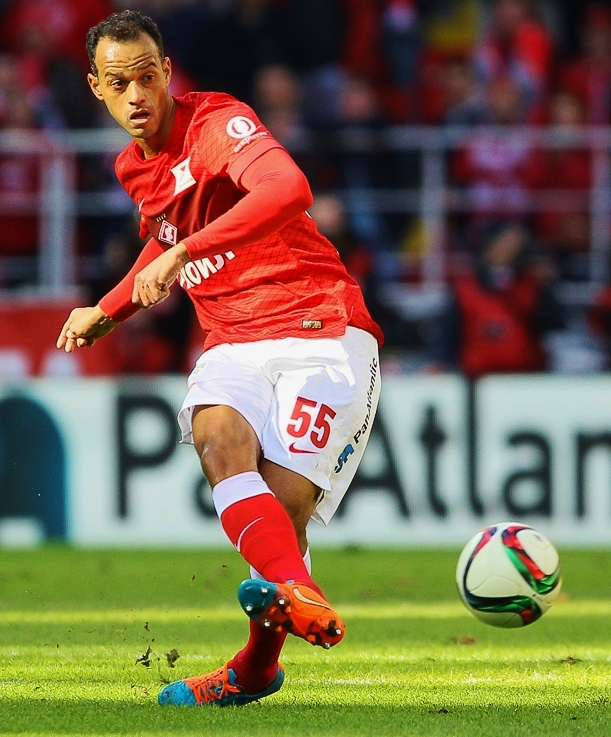
- With Spartak Moscow in 2015

Personal information
- Full name: João Carlos Pinto Chaves
- Date of birth: 1 January 1982 (age 44)
- Place of birth: Rio de Janeiro, Brazil
- Height: 1.89 m (6 ft 2 1/2 in)
- Position: Central defender

Senior career*
Years	Team	Apps	(Gls)
2001–2002	Vasco da Gama	13	(0)
2002–2004	CSKA Sofia	46	(4)
2004–2008	Lokeren	114	(8)
2008–2011	Genk	73	(11)
2011–2013	Anzhi Makhachkala	56	(3)
2013–2015	Spartak Moscow	30	(1)
2015	Vasco da Gama	0	(0)
2016	Lokeren	15	(0)
2016–2017	Al Jazira	8	(0)
2018	Madureira	4	(0)
- * Club domestic league appearances and goals

João Carlos Pinto Chaves (born 1 January 1982), known as just João Carlos, is a Brazilian former professional footballer who played as a central defender.

== Career ==
Born in Rio de Janeiro, João Carlos has played professionally in Brazil, Bulgaria, Belgium and Russia for Vasco da Gama, CSKA Sofia, Lokeren, Genk and Anzhi Makhachkala.

== Honours ==
Genk

- Belgian Cup: 2008–09
