= Marcos Charras =

Argentine footballer

Personal information
- Full name: Marcos Emanuel Charras
- Date of birth: May 13, 1983 (age 43)
- Place of birth: Rosario, Argentina
- Height: 1.75 m (5 ft 9 in)
- Position: Left back

Senior career*
Years	Team	Apps	(Gls)
2002	Rosario Central		(0)
2002–2005	CSKA Sofia	25	(3)
2005	Vélez Sársfield	0	(0)
2005–2006	Quilmes	2	(0)
2006–2007	FC Dallas	0	(0)
2008–2010	FC Dinamo Tbilisi	6	(0)

International career
2003	Argentina U-20	1	(0)
- * Club domestic league appearances and goals

Marcos Emanuel Charras (born 13 May 1983) is a retired Argentine football player.

== Honours ==
- South American U-20 Championship: 2003
- Torneo Clausura: 2005
