= List of foreign football players in A PFG =

This is a list of foreign football players in Bulgarian A Professional Football Group. The players written with bold text are currently playing in the A PFG.

== Bulgarian players naturalized and born abroad ==
- (France) Alexandre Barthe – Litex Lovech, Ludogorets Razgrad, CSKA Sofia 2008–15, 2017–18
- (Germany) Aleks Borimirov – Levski Sofia 2016–
- (Brazil) Cicinho – Ludogorets Razgrad 2015–
- (Serbia) Ivan Čvorović – Chernomorets Burgas, Minyor Pernik, Ludogorets Razgrad, Botev Plovdiv 2008–
- (Brazil) Diego Ferraresso – Litex Lovech, Lokomotiv Plovdiv, Slavia Sofia 2008–10, 2012–16
- (Portugal) Ilian Iliev – Cherno More 2016–17
- (Serbia) Zoran Janković – Litex Lovech 2000–02, 2003–04, 2007–08
- (Brazil) Marcelinho – Ludogorets Razgrad 2011–2020
- (Brazil) Marquinhos – Belasitsa Petrich, CSKA Sofia, Pirin Blagoevgrad 2005–11, 2014–16
- (Bosnia and Herzegovina) (Serbia) Predrag Pažin – Levski Sofia, Lokomotiv Mezdra 1999–2001, 2009–10
- (Brazil) Tiago Silva – Litex Lovech, CSKA Sofia 2001–07
- (Croatia) Igor Tomašić – Levski Sofia 2005–08
- (Brazil) Lúcio Wagner – Cherno More, Levski Sofia 2002–10
- (Brazil) Wanderson – Ludogorets Razgrad 2014–
- (Canada) Dominik Yankov – Ludogorets Razgrad, Botev Vratsa 2017–
- (Serbia) Zlatomir Zagorčić – Litex Lovech 1997–99, 2002–05

== Listed by country ==
=== Afghanistan ===
- Faysal Shayesteh – Etar 1924 2013

=== Albania ===
- Donaldo Açka - Lokomotiv Sofia 2024-present
- Skënder Begeja - Akademik Sofia 1948–50
- Ditmar Bicaj - Belasitsa Petrich 2008–09
- Flo Bojaj - Pirin Blagoevgrad, Etar Veliko Tarnovo 2018, 2018–2020
- Alban Bushi - Litex Lovech 1997–99
- Kevin Dodaj - CSKA Sofia 2025-present
- Albi Dosti - Montana 2015
- Apostol Furxhiu - Botev Vratsa 2019
- Erdenis Gurishta - CSKA 1948 2023-2024
- Jurgen Gjasula - Litex Lovech 2013–14
- Edon Hasani - Litex Lovech 2012–13
- Altin Haxhi - Litex Lovech, CSKA Sofia 1998–00, 2003–04
- Albin Romain Hodza – Pirin Gotse Delchev, Lyubimets 2007 2012–14
- Redi Kasa - Septemvri Sofia, Tsarsko Selo 2021-2023
- Enco Malindi - Slavia Sofia, Spartak Varna 2007–09
- Uerdi Mara - Beroe Stara Zagora 2023
- Kushtrim Munishi - Lokomotiv Plovdiv 1995
- Ndue Mujeci - Pirin Blagoevgrad, Dunav Ruse 2016–17
- Andi Renja - Pirin Blagoevgrad 2017–18, Vitosha Bistritsa 2018–19
- Muharrem Sahiti - Lokomotiv Plovdiv 1994–96
- Klodian Semina - Belasitsa Petrich 2008
- Armando Vajushi - Litex Lovech 2012–14

=== Algeria ===
- Jonas Albenas - CSKA 1948 2025
- Najib Ammari - Chernomorets, Levski Sofia 2013–14
- Zakaria Benchaâ - Cherno More Varna 2022
- Farid Benramdane - Minyor Pernik 2011–13
- Karim Bouhmidi - Lokomotiv Sofia 2021
- Mehdi Boukassi - Cherno More Varna 2019–20
- Chahreddine Boukholda - Arda Kardzhali, FC Etar Veliko Tarnovo 2023-2024
- Sabri Boumelaha - Minyor Pernik 2012
- Fadel Brahami - Minyor Pernik, Montana 2010–13, 2013–14
- Farès Brahimi - Minyor Pernik 2011–13
- Nabil Ejenavi - Montana 2016
- Mehdi Fennouche - Lokomotiv Gorna Oryahovitsa, Vereya 2016–17, Cherno More Varna 2018–2019
- Yanis Guermouche - FC Krumovgrad, Hebar Pazardzhik 2024-2025, Slavia Sofia 2025-present
- Jugurtha Hamroun - Chernomorets 2011–12
- Ilias Hassani - Vereya, Cherno More Varna 2016–17 Arda Kardzhali, Beroe 2019–2021
- Salim Kerkar - Beroe Stara Zagora, Vereya 2014–2018
- Raïs M'Bolhi - Slavia Sofia, CSKA Sofia 2009–10, 2011–12, 2013–14
- Selman Nassar-Chouiter - Hebar Pazardzhik 2025
- Amir Sayoud - Beroe Stara Zagora 2013
- Ahmed Touba - Beroe Stara Zagora 2019–20
- Yanis Youcef - Chernomorets 2013
- Nassim Zitouni - Dunav 2018

=== Angola ===
- Aldaír Ferreira - Etar Veliko Tarnovo 2020–21
- Amâncio Fortes - CSKA Sofia 2015
- Osvaldo Saldanha - Vihren Sandanski 2006
- Luis Pedro - Tsarsko Selo 2020–21
- Show - Ludogorets Razgrad 2021-23

=== Argentina ===
- Federico Varela – CSKA Sofia 2021–
- Nicolás Femia – Etar Veliko Tarnovo 2020–
- Franco Mazurek – Levski Sofia 2019–20
- Jorge Broun – Ludogorets Razgrad 2017–2019
- Santiago Villafañe – Montana 2017
- José Luis Palomino – Ludogorets Razgrad 2016–17
- Juan Manuel Varea – Cherno More Varna 2015
- Guido Di Vanni – CSKA Sofia 2014
- Elian Parrino – Lokomotiv Plovdiv 2014
- Sebastián Sciorilli – CSKA Sofia 2012–13
- Juan Pablo Compagnucci – Lokomotiv Plovdiv 2011–12
- Lucas Trecarichi – CSKA Sofia 2010–11
- Adrián Fernández – Cherno More, Chernomorets Burgas 2008–10
- Roberto Carboni – Chernomorets Burgas 2009–10
- Gaston Pisani – Vihren Sandanski 2008–09
- Federico Villar – Spartak Varna 2008
- Mauro Alegre – Botev Plovdiv 2006–09
- Germán Pietrobon – Pirin Blagoevgrad, CSKA Sofia, Sportist Svoge 2007–2010
- Emmanuel Martínez – Pirin Blagoevgrad 2008
- Marcos Charras – CSKA Sofia 2002–05
- Claudio Graf – Litex Lovech 2002–03
- Marcelo Sarmiento – Litex Lovech 2002–03

=== Armenia ===
- Artashes Adamyan - Spartak Plovdiv 1994–96
- Armen Ambartsumyan – Botev Plovdiv, Maarek Dupnitsa, Slavia Sofia 1997–2007
- Tigran Gharabaghtsyan – Cherno More 2008
- Razmik Grigoryan – CSKA Sofia, Spartak Varna 1994–95, 1996–97
- Samvel Melkonyan – Chernomorets Burgas 2012
- Rumyan Hovsepyan – Arda Kardzhali 2019–20

=== Australia ===
- Tomi Juric – CSKA Sofia 2019–20
- Peter Makrillos – Slavia Sofia 2021–

=== Austria ===
- Deni Alar – Levski Sofia 2019–20
- Edin Bahtić – Lokomotiv Plovdiv, Tsarsko Selo 2019–2020
- Hidajet Hankič – Botev Plovdiv 2021–24
- Maximilian Karner – Levski Sofia 2015–16
- Kenan Muslimović – Lokomotiv Plovdiv 2020
- Patrick Wessely – Septemvri Sofia 2017

=== Azerbaijan ===
- Emin Quliyev – Litex Lovech 2001

=== Belgium ===
- Abdelhakim Bouhna – Lokomotiv Plovdiv 2018–19
- Seydina Diarra – Vereya 2018
- Emmerik De Vriese – Lokomotiv Plovdiv 2014–15
- Christian Kabasele – Ludogorets Razgrad 2011–12
- Faysel Kasmi – Cherno More Varna 2020–21
- Jeanvion Yulu-Matondo – Levski Sofia 2011
- Elisha Sam – Arda Kardzhali 2019–20

=== Belarus ===
- Uladzimir Shuneyka – Levski Sofia 2003

=== Benin ===
- Félicien Singbo – Lokomotiv Plovdiv 2008–10
- Cédric Hountondji – Levski Sofia 2019
- Olivier Verdon – Ludogorets Razgrad 2020–
- David Kiki – Montana, Arda Kardzhali 2020–21, 2021–2022

=== Bosnia and Herzegovina ===
- Edin Ademović – Belasitsa Petrich 2008–09
- Džemal Berberović – Litex Lovech 2005–09, 2010–2011, 2013–2014
- Hamza Čataković – CSKA Sofia 2021–2022
- Dalibor Dragić – Levski Sofia, Cherno More, Marek Dupnitsa 2000–04
- Goran Galešić – Botev Plovdiv 2014–2015
- Suvad Grabus – Ludogorets Razgrad 2011–2012
- Vladan Grujić – Litex Lovech 2006
- Sead Halilagić – Slavia Sofia 2001–02
- Sergej Jakirović – CSKA Sofia 2005–07
- Mirza Mešić – Lokomotiv Sofia 2011–12
- Bojan Trkulja – Beroe 2007

=== Brazil ===
- Lucas Dias – Tsarsko Selo 2021
- Jonata Machado – Lokomotiv Sofia 2021
- Marquinhos – Botev Plovdiv 2021
- Alex Santana – Ludogorets Razgrad 2020–
- Marquinhos Pedroso – Botev Plovdiv 2020–2021
- Juninho – Arda Kardzhali 2020–2021
- Lucas Willian – Arda Kardzhali, Tsarsko Selo, Beroe Stara Zagora 2019–2020, 2022–
- Léo Fioravanti – Tsarsko Selo 2020
- Cauly – Ludogorets Razgrad 2020–
- Lucas Salinas – Lokomotiv Plovdiv 2020–2022
- Anderson Barbosa – Botev Plovdiv 2020
- Octávio – Beroe Stara Zagora, Lokomotiv Sofia 2020–21, 2021–
- Anderson Cordeiro – Tsarsko Selo 2019–
- Everton Dias – Tsarsko Selo 2019
- Wesley Natã – Tsarsko Selo 2019–2020
- Gustavo Carbonieri – Tsarsko Selo 2019–2021
- Nando – Dunav Ruse 2019–20
- Gustavo Busatto – CSKA Sofia 2019–
- Taylon – Botev Plovdiv 2019
- Ebert – Botev Plovdiv 2019
- Rodrigo Henrique – Cherno More Varna 2019–2022
- David Ribeiro – Ludogorets Razgrad 2019, Botev Vratsa 2019
- Wanderson Viana – Beroe Stara Zagora 2018–19
- Johnathan – Botev Plovdiv 2018–2021, Beroe Stara Zagora 2021–2022, CSKA 1948 2022–
- Jorginho – Cherno More Varna 2018–2019
- Geferson – CSKA Sofia 2018–
- Evandro – CSKA Sofia 2018–2020
- Paulinho – Levski Sofia 2018–2021
- Rivaldinho – Levski Sofia 2018–2019
- Luan Viana – Levski Sofia 2018–2019
- Eliton Junior – Lokomotiv Plovdiv 2018–2019
- Wiris – Lokomotiv Plovdiv 2018–2020
- Júnior Brandão – Ludogorets Razgrad 2018–
- Fabiano Alves – Septemvri Sofia 2018–2019
- Victor Luiz – Septemvri Sofia 2018
- Alfredo – Beroe Stara Zagora 2018
- Diogo Campos – Botev Plovdiv 2018
- Maurides – CSKA Sofia 2018
- Duda – Dunav 2018
- Gláucio – Dunav 2018
- Esquerdinha – Dunav 2018
- Luís Cláudio – Dunav 2018
- Jatobá – Dunav 2017–18
- Matheus Leoni – Beroe Stara Zagora, Arda Kardzhali 2017–2020
- Henrique – CSKA Sofia 2017–2021
- Rafael Forster – Ludogorets Razgrad 2017–2020
- Renan dos Santos – Ludogorets Razgrad 2017–2021
- Álvaro Juliano – Botev Plovdiv 2017–18
- Fernando Karanga – CSKA Sofia 2017–19
- Fernando Viana – Botev Plovdiv 2017–18, 2019
- Gustavo Sauer – Botev Plovdiv 2017–18
- Jean Patric – Septemvri Sofia 2017–18
- Matheus Bissi – Slavia Sofia 2017
- Alexandre Hans – Pirin Blagoevgrad 2016–2017
- Felipe Brisola – Botev Plovdiv 2016–18
- Gustavo Campanharo – Ludogorets Razgrad 2016–19
- João Paulo – Botev Plovdiv, Ludogorets Razgrad 2016–2020
- Rafael – Botev Plovdiv 2016
- Danillo Bala – Montana 2016
- Victor Golas – Botev Plovdiv 2015–16
- Jonathan Cafú – Ludogorets Razgrad 2015–17
- Natanael – Ludogorets Razgrad 2015–2019
- Cicinho – Ludogorets Razgrad 2015–
- Wanderson – Ludogorets Razgrad 2014–
- Lucas Sasha – CSKA Sofia, Ludogorets Razgrad 2012–13, 2015–2019
- Marcinho – Levski Sofia 2012–13
- Elias – Beroe Stara Zagora, Vereya 2012–16, 2016–18
- Juninho Quixadá – Ludogorets Razgrad 2011–18
- Guilherme Choco – Ludogorets Razgrad, Montana, Lokomotiv Plovdiv 2011–2014, 2016, 2017–18
- Júnior Moraes – CSKA Sofia 2011–2012
- Lourival Assis – Chernomorets Burgas 2011–2012
- Luiz Eduardo – Montana, Etar 1924 2010–2012
- Mário Jardel – Cherno More 2010
- Francisco Alberoni – Slavia Sofia 2010
- Rodrigo Galatto – Litex Lovech 2010
- Dalmo – Chernomorets Burgas 2010
- Gabriel Atz – Chernomorets Burgas 2010–11
- Jose Junior – Slavia Sofia, Levski Sofia 2009–13
- Ademar Júnior – Cherno More, CSKA Sofia 2009–12
- Doka Madureira – Litex Lovech 2009–11
- Marco Tulio – Lokomotiv Mezdra 2009
- Carlos – Slavia Sofia 2009
- Everton Gilio – Lokomotiv Plovdiv, Minyor Pernik, Lokomotiv Sofia, Beroe Stara Zagora 2008–17
- Diego Ferraresso – Litex Lovech, Lokomotiv Plovdiv, Slavia Sofia, Botev Vratsa 2008–2016, 2021–
- Michel Platini – Chernomorets Burgas, CSKA Sofia, Ludogorets Razgrad, Slavia Sofia 2008–11, 2012–2014
- Dudu – Chernomorets Burgas 2008–10
- Joãozinho – Levski Sofia 2007–11
- Adriano Miranda – Litex Lovech 2008–10
- Zé Soares – Levski Sofia 2007–10
- Jean Carlos – Levski Sofia 2007–09
- Beto – Belasitsa Petrich, Slavia Sofia, Montana 2007–09
- Eli Marques – Belasitsa Petrich, CSKA Sofia, Cherno More, Slavia Sofia, Svetkavitsa, Lokomotiv Plovdiv, Etar 1924 2007–13
- Dudu Paraíba – Marek Dupnitsa, Litex Lovech 2006–09
- Filipe Machado – CSKA Sofia 2007–09
- Eriverton – Vihren Sandanski 2007–09
- Miran – Vihren Sandanski 2007–08
- Ademar – Vihren Sandanski 2007
- Elton – Slavia Sofia 2007–08
- Peris – Cherno More 2007–09
- Djalma – Cherno More 2007
- Fabinho Recife – Cherno More 2007
- Beto – Litex Lovech 2007
- Nei – CSKA Sofia 2007–08
- Eduardo Du Bala – Belasitsa Petrich, Litex Lovech, Slavia Sofia (2006–09)
- Markos Da Silva – Cherno More 2006–08
- Tiago Treichel – Litex Lovech 2006
- Tom – Litex Lovech, Botev Vratsa 2006–2011, 2013–2014, 2020–21
- Júlio César – Belasitsa Petrich, Montana 2006, 2009
- Dakson – Lokomotiv Plovdiv 2006–09, 2011–2012
- Alex dos Santos – Lokomotiv Plovdiv 2006
- Diano – Belasitsa Petrich, Levski Sofia 2005–08
- Sandrinho – Litex Lovech 2005–12
- Joãozinho – Litex Lovech 2004–05
- Léo Lima – CSKA Sofia 2003
- Rodrigo Souza – CSKA Sofia 2003
- Junivan – Lokomotiv Plovdiv, Belasitsa Petrich 2001–05, 2006–07
- João Carlos – CSKA Sofia 2002–04
- Agnaldo – CSKA Sofia 2002–03
- Dedé – Litex Lovech 2002–03
- Lúcio Wagner – Cherno More, Levski Sofia 2002–10
- Tiago Silva – Litex Lovech, CSKA Sofia 2001–04, 2005–07
- Henrique – Litex Lovech 2001–03
- Gustavo – Levski Sofia 2002
- William Batista – Levski Sofia 2001–02
- Gaúcho – Levski Sofia 2001
- Leonidas – Levski Sofia 2000–01
- Vava – Belasitsa Petrich, Levski Sofia 2000–05
- Rogério Pereira – Slavia Sofia, Belasitsa Petrich 1993–98

Alex Arruda - PFC Lokomotiv Sofia (2002/03)

=== Burkina Faso ===
- Habib Bamogo – Botev Plovdiv 2013–2014
- Issouf Ouattara – Chernomorets Burgas 2012–2013

=== Cameroon ===
- Pierre Fonkeu – Beroe Stara Zagora 2020
- Raoul Loé – CSKA Sofia 2017–18
- Justin Mengolo – Levski Sofia 2016
- Petrus Boumal – Litex Lovech, CSKA Sofia 2014–17
- Franck Mbarga – Slavia Sofia 2014–2015
- Njongo Priso – CSKA Sofia 2012–13
- Alfred Mapoka – Botev Plovdiv 2009
- Gustave Bahoken – Botev Plovdiv 2009
- Marcel Elame – Beroe, Lokomotiv Plovdiv, Vihren Sandanski 2004–2009
- Daniel Bekono – Beroe, CSKA Sofia 2003–2007, 2008–2009

=== Canada ===
- Alessandro Hojabrpour – Lokomotiv Plovdiv 2017–18
- Milan Borjan – Ludogorets Razgrad 2014–17

=== Cape Verde ===
- Kukula – Beroe Stara Zagora 2020–2022
- Steve Furtado – Beroe Stara Zagora 2020–2022, CSKA 1948 2022–
- Patrick Andrade – Cherno More 2018–2020
- Steven Pereira – CSKA Sofia 2018–19
- Jerson Cabral – Levski Sofia 2017–2019
- Gilson Varela – Etar Veliko Tarnovo 2018–19
- Helton Dos Reis – Lokomotiv Sofia, Litex Lovech, Septemvri Sofia 2013–2015, 2017–2018
- Nilton Fernandes – Chernomorets Burgas 2009–2010
- Jair – CSKA Sofia 1996–98
- Rodolfo Lima – Vihren Sandanski 2007–08
- Platini – CSKA Sofia 2014–2015
- Jerson Ribeiro – Etar 1924 (2013)
- Garry Rodrigues – Levski Sofia 2013–14
- José Rui – CSKA Sofia 2007–08
- Sténio – Cherno More, Botev Plovdiv 2014–16

=== Central African Republic ===
- Fernander Kassaï – Slavia Sofia 2014–2015
- David Manga – Beroe Stara Zagora 2016–2017
- Amos Youga – CSKA Sofia 2020–

=== Chad ===
- Azrack Mahamat – Etar 1924, Lokomotiv Sofia 2012–2014

=== Chile ===
- Carlos Espinosa – FC Lyubimetz 2007 2011
- Mario Núñez – Litex Lovech 2001–2002
- Mario Nunes – Naftex Burgas 2003

=== Colombia ===
- Fáider Burbano – Botev Plovdiv 2020
- Andrés Sánchez – Vitosha Bistritsa 2019
- Jean Carlos Blanco – CSKA Sofia 2018
- Sergio Castañeda – Septemvri Sofia 2018
- Gustavo Culma – Litex Lovech, CSKA Sofia 2016–18
- Rafa Pérez – Litex Lovech, CSKA Sofia 2015–2017
- Henry Rojas – Litex Lovech 2015
- Brayan Angulo – Ludogorets Razgrad 2014–2016
- Wilmar Jordán – Litex Lovech, CSKA Sofia 2013–2016
- Danilo Moreno Asprilla – Litex Lovech 2013–2015
- Sebastián Hernández – Ludogorets Razgrad, Cherno More 2013–2015
- Carlos Pimiento – CSKA Sofia 1990–1992
- Hamilton Ricard – CSKA Sofia 2001–2002
- Bernardo Redín – CSKA Sofia 1990–1991

=== Congo ===
- Dominique Malonga – Lokomotiv Plovdiv 2020
- Gaius Makouta – Beroe Stara Zagora 2020–21
- Bradley Mazikou – CSKA Sofia 2019–
- Mavis Tchibota – Ludogorets Razgrad 2019–
- Dylan Bahamboula – Tsarsko Selo 2019–20
- Hugo Konongo – Cherno More Varna 2018–19
- Kévin Koubemba – CSKA Sofia 2016–18
- Christoffer Mafoumbi – Vereya 2015–16
- Férébory Doré – Botev Plovdiv 2014–15, 2019

=== Côte d'Ivoire ===
- Oumar Sako – Beroe Stara Zagora, Arda Kardzhali 2021-
- Yaya Meledje – Septemvri Sofia, Botev Plovdiv, Beroe Stara Zagora 2016–2020
- Quatara Mamadu – Bdin 2011–2012
- Abudramae Bamba – Chernomorets Burgas, Lokomotiv Mezdra 2008–2010
- Guillaume Dah Zadi – CSKA Sofia 2005–2007
- Serge Yoffou – Dobrudzha Dobrich, Levski Sofia 1998–2001

=== Croatia ===
- Karlo Muhar – CSKA Sofia 2021–
- Kristijan Kahlina – Ludogorets Razgrad 2021–
- Zvonimir Mikulić – Levski Sofia 2021
- Filip Mihaljević – Lokomotiv Plovdiv 2020–21
- Christian Ilić – Lokomotiv Plovdiv 2020–21
- Lovre Knežević – Arda Kardzhali, Etar Veliko Tarnovo 2020, 2021–
- Mihovil Klapan – Lokomotiv Plovdiv 2020
- Nediljko Kovačević – Slavia Sofia 2019
- Filip Žderić – Botev Vratsa 2019
- Nikola Marić – Lokomotiv Plovdiv 2019–20
- Dante Stipica – CSKA Sofia 2018–19
- Ante Aralica – Lokomotiv Plovdiv 2018–2020
- Josip Tomašević – Lokomotiv Plovdiv 2018–2020, 2021–
- Marko Pervan – Botev Plovdiv 2019
- Vilim Posinković – Lokomotiv Plovdiv 2018–19
- Antoni Milina – Lokomotiv Plovdiv 2018–2019
- Duje Mrdeša – Lokomotiv Plovdiv 2018
- Filip Mihaljević – Lokomotiv Plovdiv 2018
- Jurica Buljat – Lokomotiv Plovdiv 2018
- Igor Banović – Lokomotiv Plovdiv 2017–2019
- Mateas Delić – Beroe 2017
- Mario Rašić – Neftochimic Burgas 2016
- Mario Brkljača – CSKA Sofia 2015
- Marin Oršulić – CSKA Sofia 2014–2015
- Tonći Kukoč – CSKA Sofia 2014–2015
- Goran Blažević – Levski Sofia 2013–2014
- Tomislav Mišura – Lokomotiv Sofia 2006
- Victor Špišic – Beroe, Lokomotiv Sofia 2005–2010
- Vanja Džaferović – Beroe, Lokomotiv Sofia, Beroe 2005–07, 2008–2010, 2011–2012
- Matija Matko – CSKA Sofia 2004–05

=== Curaçao ===
- Nigel Robertha – Levski Sofia 2019–2021
- Jeremy de Nooijer – Levski Sofia 2015–2017
- Dustley Mulder – Levski Sofia 2010–2014
- Civard Sprockel – CSKA Sofia, Botev Plovdiv 2012–2014

=== Cyprus ===
- Stelios Demetriou – Lokomotiv Plovdiv 2012–2013
- Giannis Gerolemou – Tsarsko Selo 2020–2021
- Panagiotis Louka – Tsarsko Selo 2020–2021
- Christos Shelis – Levski Sofia (2021–)
- Pieros Sotiriou – Ludogorets Razgrad 2021–

=== Czech Republic ===
- David Bystroň – Levski Sofia 2008–2009
- Robert Caha – CSKA Sofia 2004–2005
- Tomáš Černý – CSKA Sofia 2012–2014
- Pavel Čmovš – Levski Sofia 2014
- Jakub Diviš – CSKA Sofia 2014–2015
- Filip Hlúpik – Cherno More 2017
- David Jablonský – Levski Sofia 2017–2019
- Tomáš Jirsák – Botev Plovdiv 2012–2015
- Přemysl Kovář – Cherno More 2016
- Jiří Lenko – Lokomotiv Mezdra 2008–2009
- Jan Malík – Cherno More 2016
- Tomáš Mica – Naftex Burgas 2004–2005
- Tomáš Okleštěk – Minyor Pernik 2011
- Radek Petr – Ludogorets Razgrad 2012
- Martin Slavík – Slavia Sofia 1991–00, 2001–02
- Vojtěch Šrom – Cherno More 2017
- Ondřej Sukup – Cherno More 2016–18

=== Denmark ===
- Emil Jørgensen – Vereya 2018

=== DR Congo ===
- Jordan Ikoko – Ludogorets Razgrad 2019–
- Lynel Kitambala – Levski Sofia 2015
- Jody Lukoki – Ludogorets Razgrad 2015–2020
- Trésor Luntala – Lokomotiv Plovdiv 2010
- Junior Mapuku – Beroe, Levski Sofia 2014–2015, 2016–2017, 2017–2018
- Masena Moke – CSKA Sofia, Beroe, Cherno More, Vihren Sandanski 2000–2001, 2002–2004, 2006–2009
- Aristote N'Dongala – Lokomotiv Gorna Oryahovitsa 2017; Cherno More 2018–2019
- Aurélien Ngeyitala – Chernomorets Burgas; Vereya 2012–2013, 2019
- Christopher Oualembo – Chernomorets Burgas 2012

=== Egypt ===
- Mahmoud Abdelaati – Svetkavitsa 2011
- Mohamed Tawakol – Svetkavitsa 2011
- Magdy Tolba – Levski Sofia 1992–1993

=== England ===
- Brian Howard – CSKA Sofia 2013
- Ross Jenkins – Pirin Blagoevgrad 2017
- Jemal Johnson – Lokomotiv Sofia 2011
- Connor Randall – Arda Kardzhali 2019–20
- Connor Ruane – Lokomotiv Plovdiv 2021–
- Jerome Sinclair – CSKA Sofia 2020–21
- Viv Solomon-Otabor – CSKA Sofia 2019–20

=== Ecuador ===
- Jordy Caicedo – CSKA Sofia 2021–
- Kevin Mercado – CSKA Sofia 2017–19
- Manuel Mendoza – Levski Sofia 2002–2003

=== Equatorial Guinea ===
- Iván Bolado – CSKA Sofia 2012

=== Estonia ===
- Karol Mets – CSKA Sofia 2021–
- Mark Edur – Etar Veliko Tarnovo 2020
- Nikita Baranov – Beroe 2019
- Edgar Tur – Botev Vratsa 2019
- Trevor Elhi – Botev Vratsa 2019
- Artjom Artjunin – Etar Veliko Tarnovo 2018–19
- Bogdan Vaštšuk – Levski Sofia 2018–19
- Daniil Ratnikov – Cherno More 2010–2011
- Eduard Ratnikov – Beroe 2005–2007
- Joel Lindpere – CSKA Sofia 2004–2005

=== Finland ===
- Thomas Lam – CSKA Sofia 2021–2022
- Didis Lutumba-Pitah – Etar Veliko Tarnovo 2024
- Ville Salmikivi – Beroe 2017
- Tero Mäntylä – Ludogorets Razgrad 2012–2014
- Patrik Rikama-Hinnenberg – Etar 1924 2013

=== France ===
- Jérémy Acedo - Litex Lovech 2008
- Bilel Aït Malek - Vereya 2018
- Yohan Baï – CSKA Sofia 2021–2022, Lokomotiv Plovdiv 2024
- Joakim Balmy - Cherno More 2019
- Cédric Bardon - Levski Sofia 2005–2007, 2009–2010
- Antoine Baroan – Botev Plovdiv 2021–2024, Ludogorets Razgrad 2025
- Alexandre Barthe - Litex Lovech 2008–2011, Ludogorets Razgrad 2011–2015, CSKA Sofia 2017–2018
- Marc-Gauthier Bedimé - Lokomotiv Plovdiv 2017
- Anthony Belmonte - Levski Sofia 2017–2019
- Samir Bengelloun - Lokomotiv Plovdiv (2010–2011)
- Youness Bengelloun - Lokomotiv Plovdiv (2010–2012), CSKA Sofia (2012–2013)
- Alexis Bertin - Litex Lovech (2008–09)
- Fabien Boudarène - Litex Lovech 2007–2008
- Adam Boujamaa - Montana 2021
- Mohamed Brahimi - Tsarsko Selo, Pirin Blagoevgrad, Botev Plovdiv 2020–2024
- Jean-Philippe Caillet - Litex Lovech 2005–2006
- Cédric Cambon - Litex Lovech 2007–2009
- Benoît Cauet - CSKA Sofia 2004–2005
- Mohamed Chemlal - Vereya 2018
- Mounir Chouiar - Ludogorets Razgrad 2023-present
- Salif Cissé - Tsarsko Selo, Botev Plovdiv 2020, 2020–21
- Hugo Cointard - Botev Vratsa 2019
- Thomas Dasquet - Levski Sofia 2020–21
- Sadio Dembélé - Lokomotiv Sofia 2025-present
- Bamba Diarrassouba - Montana 2016–2017
- Mory Diaw - Lokomotiv Plovdiv 2017
- Mouhamed Dosso - Slavia Sofia 2025-present
- Michel Espinosa - Botev Plovdiv 2020–2021
- Jérémy Faug-Porret - Chernomorets Burgas 2011–2013, CSKA Sofia 2013–2014
- Jacques Fey - Etar 1924 (2012–2013)
- Bertrand Fourrier – Septemvri Sofia 2024-present
- Chris Gadi - Lokomotiv Plovdiv 2013–2014, Beroe 2014–2015, Septemvri Sofia, Etar Veliko Tarnovo 2017–2019, 2019
- Christian Gomis - Lokomotiv Plovdiv 2020–2022
- Elliot Grandin - CSKA Sofia 2010
- Kelyan Guessoum - Etar Veliko Tarnovo 2024
- Steeve Joseph-Reinette - Slavia Sofia 2009–2010
- Joël Kiki N'Gako - Belasitsa Petrich 2005–2008
- Oliver Kamdem - Lokomotiv Plovdiv, Levski Sofia 2023-present
- Moussa Koita - Chernomorets Burgas 2010–2011
- Omar Kossoko - CSKA Sofia 2013–14, Litex Lovech 2014, Botev Plovdiv 2016–17
- Enock Kwateng - Botev Plovdiv 2025-present
- Julien Lamy - Lokomotiv Plovdiv 2024-present
- Keelan Lebon - Beroe Stara Zagora 2020–2022
- Florian Lucchini - Vihren Sandanski 2008–2009, Lokomotiv Plovdiv 2010–2012
- Karl Madianga - Lokomotiv Gorna Oryahovitsa 2017
- Aristote Madiani - Vitosha Bistritsa 2020
- Vincent Marcel – Lokomotiv Plovdiv, Hebar Pazardzhik 2021-2023
- Damien Marie - Tsarsko Selo 2019
- Teddy Mézague - Beroe Stara Zagora 2020–2021
- Louis Nganioni - Levski Sofia, Tsarsko Selo 2018–19, 2021
- Wilfried Niflore - Litex Lovech 2008–2011
- Alassane N'Diaye - Lokomotiv Plovdiv, Beroe Stara Zagora, Botev Vratsa 2013–14, 2014–15, 2020–2021
- Daudet N'Dongala - Slavia Sofia, Botev Plovdiv, Dunav Ruse 2015–16, 2017–18, 2020
- Lévi Ntumba - CSKA 1948, Slavia Sofia 2024-present
- Junior Nzila – CSKA Sofia 2021–2022
- Gabriel Obertan - Levski Sofia 2017–19
- Réda Rabeï – Botev Plovdiv 2021–2023
- Jérémie Rodrigues - Lokomotiv Plovdiv, CSKA Sofia, Lokomotiv Sofia 2010–2014
- Birahim Sarr - Montana 2016–2017
- Saër Sène - Montana 2016–2017
- Rayan Senhadji – Montana 2020–21, Pirin Blagoevgrad, FC Krumovgrad 2022-2023
- Kléri Serber – Botev Vratsa, Septemvri Sofia 2022-present
- Ludovic Soares – Slavia Sofia 2021–2024
- Aymen Souda - Lokomotiv GO, Lokomotiv Plovdiv 2015-2017, Pirin Blagoevgrad 2017–2018, 2023-25, Botev Vratsa 2025-present
- Amadou Soukouna - Levski Sofia, Cherno More 2016–18
- Mazire Soula - Cherno More, Levski Sofia 2022-present
- Samuel Souprayen – Botev Plovdiv 2021–2023
- Kevin Tapoko – Beroe Stara Zagora 2022
- Nicolas Taravel - Arda Kardzhali 2021
- Cédric Uras - Litex Lovech 2007–2009
- Thibaut Vion - CSKA Sofia 2020–present

=== Gabon ===
- Gaëtan Missi Mezu – Etar Veliko Tarnovo, Tsarsko Selo 2021–
- Ulysse Ndong – Lokomotiv Gorna Oryahovitsa, Slavia Sofia, Vereya 2016–18
- Alexander N'Doumbou – Vereya 2018

=== Gambia ===
- Ali Sowe – CSKA Sofia 2018–2021
- Alasana Manneh – Etar Veliko Tarnovo 2018–2019
- Bacari – Cherno More 2013–2017
- Njogu Demba-Nyrén – Levski Sofia 2003

=== Georgia ===
- Goderdzi Machaidze – Vereya 2018–2019
- Amiran Mujiri – Marek Dupnitsa, CSKA Sofia 2001–2003, 2004–2005
- Avtandil Gvianidze – Botev Plovdiv 2002–2004

=== Germany ===
- Pascal Borel – Chernomorets Burgas 2009–2011
- Baldo di Gregorio – Slavia Sofia 2005
- Paul Grischok – Etar 1924 2013
- Denis Grgic – Etar Veliko Tarnovo 2018
- Steffen Karl – Lokomotiv Sofia 2001–03
- Christopher Mandiangu – Septemvri Sofia 2018–2019
- Matthias Morys – Chernomorets Burgas 2009–2010
- Savio Nsereko – Chernomorets Burgas, Beroe Stara Zagora, Vereya 2010–2011, 2014–2015, 2017–2018
- Lukas Raeder – Lokomotiv Plovdiv 2021–
- Jochen Seitz – Chernomorets Burgas 2009–2011
- Kristian Sprećaković – Cherno More 2008

=== Ghana ===
- Ishmael Baidoo – Septemvri Sofia 2017–2019
- Bismark Charles – CSKA Sofia 2021–
- Nasiru Mohammed – Levski Sofia 2019–2021
- Edwin Gyasi – CSKA Sofia 2018–2020
- Samuel Inkoom – Vereya 2017, Dunav 2019
- Derek Asamoah – Lokomotiv Sofia 2009–2010
- Godfred Bekoé – Chernomorets Burgas 2013–14
- Berthran Haktam – Lokomotiv Plovdiv 2007–09
- Isaac Kwakye – Beroe 2004–07
- Derrick Mensah – Dunav Ruse 2018
- Carlos Ohene – Beroe 2016–2018, 2019–2021, Tsarsko Selo 2021-
- Francis Narh – Levski Sofia 2016–2017
- Stephen Ofei – Litex Lovech 2004–05
- Agyemang Opoku – Levski Sofia 2012
- Michael Tawiah – Lokomotiv Mezdra, Levski Sofia 2008–2011, Vereya 2018
- Bernard Tekpetey – Ludogorets Razgrad 2020–
- Emmanuel Toku – Botev Plovdiv 2021-

=== Greece ===
- Dimitris Karademitros – Vihren Sandanski 2008–2009
- Giorgos Katsikas – Lokomotiv Sofia 2021–
- Konstantinos Kaznaferis – Lokomotiv Plovdiv 2013–2014
- Christos Kontochristos – Montana (2016)
- Aristeidis Lottas – Lokomotiv Mezdra 2008–2009
- Christos Maladenis – Vihren Sandanski 2009
- Theofilos Kouroupis – Vereya, Vitosha Bistritsa 2018–2019
- Theodoros Papoutsoyiannopoulos – Slavia Sofia 2017
- Antonis Stergiakis – Slavia Sofia 2015–2020
- Dimitrios Chantakias – Cherno More Varna 2019–2020
- Giannis Kargas – Levski Sofia 2019–20
- Dimitrios Zografakis – Vihren Sandanski 2009

=== Guinea ===
- Ousmane Baldé – Vereya 2016
- Ibrahima Conté – Beroe 2019–2021
- Jules Keita – CSKA Sofia 2020–2021
- Pa Konate – Botev Plovdiv 2021–
- Larsen Touré – Levski Sofia 2013–2014

=== Guinea-Bissau ===
- Jorginho – CSKA Sofia 2018–19, Ludogorets Razgrad 2019–
- Toni Silva – CSKA Sofia 2013–2015
- Basile de Carvalho – Lokomotiv Plovdiv, Levski Sofia 2010–2013
- Adelino Lopes – Cherno More, Beroe, Lokomotiv Sofia 2005–2009
- Inzaghi Donígio – Cherno More 2006
- Bruno Fernandes – Beroe 2005–06

=== Haiti ===
- Johny Placide – Tsarsko Selo (2019–2021)
- Jean Ambrose – Lokomotiv GO (2016–2017)

=== Hungary ===
- Gábor Erős – Lokomotiv Plovdiv (2010–2011)
- Zoltán Fehér – Vihren Sandanski (2008–2009)
- István Ferenczi – Levski Sofia (2002)
- Miklós Gaál – Slavia Sofia (2012)
- Péter Kabát – Levski Sofia (2002)
- György Sándor – Litex Lovech (2009)
- Lukács Tihamér – Vihren Sandanski (2008–2009)

=== Iceland ===
- Hólmar Örn Eyjólfsson – Levski Sofia 2017–2020
- Garðar Gunnlaugsson – CSKA Sofia (2008–2009)

=== Iraq ===
- Osama Rashid – Lokomotiv Plovdiv 2016
- Rebin Sulaka – Arda Kardzhali, Levski Sofia 2020–21, 2021

=== Ireland ===
- Graham Carey – CSKA Sofia 2019–
- Conor Henderson – Pirin Blagoevgrad 2017–18, 2021–
- Cillian Sheridan – CSKA Sofia 2010–2012

=== Israel ===
- Eli Zizov – Levski Sofia 2006–2009
- Tom Mansharov – Slavia Sofia 2010–2011
- Taleb Tawatha – Ludogorets Razgrad 2019–2020
- Dan Biton – Ludogorets Razgrad 2019–2020
- Amit Bitton – Beroe Stara Zagora 2022

=== Italy ===
- Stefano Beltrame – CSKA Sofia (2020)
- Luca Brignoli – Botev Plovdiv (2009)
- Massimiliano Brizzi – Botev Plovdiv (2009)
- Alan Carlet – Botev Plovdiv (2009)
- Michele Cruciani – Chernomorets Burgas 2012
- Marco D'Argenio – Botev Plovdiv (2009)
- Marco Di Paolo – Botev Plovdiv (2009)
- Diego Fabbrini – PFC CSKA Sofia (2019)
- Roberto Floriano – Botev Vratsa 2012–2013
- Emanuele Geria – Slavia Sofia (2017–2019)
- Fabrizio Grillo – PFC CSKA Sofia (2010–11)
- Ilario Lanna – Botev Plovdiv (2009)
- Emanuele Morini – Botev Plovdiv (2009)
- Andrea Parola – PFC Naftex Burgas (2000–01)
- Giuseppe Pira – Botev Vratsa 2012–2013
- Alberto Rebecca – Botev Plovdiv (2009)
- Giovanni Speranza – Slavia Sofia 2005–06
- Ciro Sirignano – Botev Plovdiv (2009)
- Christian Tiboni – PFC CSKA Sofia (2010–11)
- Fabio Tinazzi – Botev Plovdiv (2009)
- Gilberto Zanoletti – Botev Plovdiv (2009)

=== Japan ===
- Kohei Kato – Beroe Stara Zagora 2016–2018
- Daisuke Matsui – Slavia Sofia 2012–2013
- Taisuke Akiyoshi – Slavia Sofia 2012–2013

=== Kazakhstan ===
- Yerkebulan Seydakhmet – Levski Sofia 2019
- Yerkebulan Nurgaliyev – Vereya 2017

=== Kenya ===
- Aboud Omar – Slavia Sofia 2016–17

=== Kosovo ===
- Suad Sahiti – Septemvri Sofia 2019
- Zenun Selimi – Lokomotiv Sofia 2002–03

=== Kyrgyzstan ===
- Nazim Ajiev – Pirin Blagoevgrad 1992
- Oleg Kazmirchuk – Haskovo 1992
- Asylbek Momunov – Haskovo 1992
- Nematjan Zakirov – Pirin Blagoevgrad, PFC Velbazhd Kyustendil 1992–97

=== Latvia ===
- Andrejs Kovaļovs – Vereya Stara Zagora 2019
- Maksims Uvarenko – CSKA Sofia (2015)
- Stanislavs Pihockis – Cherno More (2009)
- Viktors Morozs – CSKA Sofia 2008–2010

=== Lebanon ===
- Samir Ayass – Akademik Sofia, Minyor Pernik, Montana, Lyubimets 2007, Beroe Stara Zagora, CSKA Sofia, Dunav Ruse Botev Vratsa 2010–2011, 2012–2015, 2016–2018, 2019, 2021
- Eyad Hammoud – Lokomotiv Plovdiv 2016–17

=== Lithuania ===
- Valdemar Borovskij – Beroe Stara Zagora 2015
- Vytautas Černiauskas – CSKA Sofia 2017–2020
- Ernestas Šetkus – Botev Plovdiv 2012–2013

=== Luxembourg ===
- Aurélien Joachim – CSKA Sofia 2014–2015

=== North Macedonia ===
- Filip Antovski – Slavia Sofia 2020–21
- Stefan Ashkovski – Slavia Sofia (2018–19)
- Boban Babunski – CSKA Sofia (1992–94)
- Dorian Babunski – Botev Vratsa (2021–)
- Zoran Baldovaliev – Lokomotiv Plovdiv, Lokomotiv Sofia 2006–2010
- Saša Ćirić – CSKA Sofia 1993
- Mite Cikarski – Botev Plovdiv (2020-)
- Aleksandar Damčevski – Chernomorets Burgas 2014
- Vlatko Drobarov – Cherno More Varna (2020–)
- Slavčo Georgievski – Vihren Sandanski (2006) – Slavia Sofia (2007–08)
- Boban Grnčarov – Botev Plovdiv 2012–2013
- Ilami Halimi – Lokomotiv Plovdiv 2004–07
- Aleksandar Isaevski – Dunav Ruse 2019–2020
- Boban Jančevski – Lokomotiv Plovdiv 2003–05
- Darko Glišić – Septemvri Sofia 2018–19 – Arda Kardzhali 2019
- Stefan Jevtoski – Lokomotiv Plovdiv 2016–2017
- Vlatko Kostov – Lokomotiv Sofia (1986–88)
- Dragi Kotsev – Pirin Blagoevgrad (2004–2010, 2014–2015) – Lokomotiv Plovdiv (2010–2013) – Pirin GD (2012–2013)
- Denis Mahmudov – Levski Sofia (2015)
- Risto Milosavov – Dobrudzha Dobrich (1995–96) – CSKA Sofia (1996–98)
- Igor Mitreski – CSKA Sofia (2010)
- Mario Mladenovski – Botev Plovdiv 2021–
- Ilija Najdoski – CSKA Sofia (1995–96)
- Jane Nikolovski – Slavia Sofia (2001–03)
- Toni Pitoška – Marek Dupnitsa (2006–07)
- Robert Petrov – Lokomotiv Plovdiv (2002–06) – CSKA Sofia (2006–08) – Slavia Sofia (2009–2010) – Lokomotiv Plovdiv (2017–2018)
- Robert Popov – Litex Lovech 2003–08
- Zekirija Ramadan – Belasitsa Petrich 2005–06
- Dušan Savić – Slavia Sofia 2014–2015
- Žarko Serafimovski – Lokomotiv Plovdiv 2002–03
- Artim Shaqiri – CSKA Sofia 2002–03
- Darko Tasevski – Levski Sofia 2007–2012, Slavia Sofia 2019–
- Vančo Trajanov – Lokomotiv Plovdiv, Chernomorets Burgas, Minyor Pernik, Chernomorets Burgas, Lokomotiv Plovdiv 2002–04, 2006–09, 2010–2012, 2013–2018
- Gjoko Zajkov – Levski Sofia (2021–)
- Zoran Zlatkovski – Pirin Blagoevgrad (2004–05; 2009–2010) – Lokomotiv Plovdiv (2005–07) – Slavia Sofia (2008) – Vihren Sandanski (2009) – Ludogorets Razgrad (2011)

=== Madagascar ===
- Anicet Andrianantenaina – PFC Chernomorets Burgas, CSKA Sofia, Botev Plovdiv, Ludogorets Razgrad 2011–

=== Mali ===
- Garra Dembélé – Levski Sofia 2010–2011
- Mamoutou Coulibaly – Cherno More 2009–2010, 2015–2016
- Mamady Sidibé – CSKA Sofia 2013–2014
- Alassane Diaby – Septemvri Sofia 2018–2019
- Soulemayne Traore – Slavia Sofia 2017–2018
- Mohamed Sylla – Vitosha Bistritsa 2019
- Aboubacar Toungara – Beroe Stara Zagora 2021–

=== Malta ===
- Daniel Bogdanovic – Cherno More, Lokomotiv Sofia 2003–2004, 2008–2009
- Stefan Giglio – CSKA Sofia, Lokomotiv Sofia 2000–2003
- Justin Haber – Dobrudzha Dobrich 1997
- Chucks Nwoko – CSKA Sofia 2001

=== Martinique ===
- Mathias Coureur – Cherno More, Lokomotiv GO, Cherno More 2014–2016, 2016, 2020–21

=== Mauritania ===
- Oumar Camara – Beroe Stara Zagora 2021–2022

=== Mauritius ===
- Kévin Bru – Levski Sofia 2013–2014

=== Moldova ===
- Artur Crăciun – Lokomotiv Plovdiv (2021–)
- Andrei Ciofu – Vereya (2018)
- Alexandru Pașcenco – Vereya (2016)
- Evgheni Hmaruc – CSKA Sofia (2004–05) – Cherno More (2008)
- Vladislav Nemeşcalo – Yantra (1992)

=== Montenegro ===
- Zoran Banović – Spartak Varna 2009
- Veljko Batrović – Etar Veliko Tarnovo 2018–2019
- Blažo Igumanović – Montana 2016–2017
- Milan Mijatović – Levski Sofia 2019–20
- Nemanja Šćekić – Montana 2017
- Marko Vidović – Levski Sofia 2011–2012
- Nikola Vujadinović – CSKA Sofia 2007–2008
- Darko Vukašinović – Slavia Sofia 2007–2008
- Milan Vušurović – Vereya, Botev Vratsa 2018–2019

=== Montserrat ===
- Corrin Brooks-Meade – Montana 2016–2017

=== Morocco ===
- Bilal Bari – Montana, Levski Sofia 2020, 2021–
- Chakib Benzoukane – Levski Sofia 2007–2010
- Mehdi Bourabia – Lokomotiv Plovdiv, Cherno More, Levski Sofia 2014–2017
- Yassine El Kharroubi – Lokomotiv Plovdiv 2015–2017
- Rayan Frikeche – Lokomotiv Plovdiv 2017
- Ilias Haddad – CSKA Sofia 2012
- Mourad Hdiouad – Litex Lovech, CSKA Sofia 2003–2006
- Abderrahman Kabous – CSKA Sofia 2007–2008
- Abdelkarim Kissi – Litex Lovech (2004–05) – Beroe (2007)
- Youssef Rabeh – Levski Sofia 2007–2010
- Faycal Rherras – Levski Sofia 2021
- Rachid Tiberkanine – Levski Sofia 2008–09

=== Mozambique ===
- Manú – Beroe Stara Zagora 2006–2007
- Jerry Sitoe – Beroe Stara Zagora 2012–2013
- David Malembana – Lokomotiv Plovdiv 2019–2021

=== Netherlands ===
- Fahd Aktaou – Cherno More Varna 2019–20
- Vurnon Anita – CSKA Sofia 2020
- Rodney Antwi – Tsarsko Selo 2019–20
- Sjoerd Ars – Levski Sofia 2011–2013
- Nordin Bakker – Beroe Stara Zagora 2021–2022
- Serginho Greene – Levski Sofia 2010–2012
- Marc Klok – Cherno More 2014–2016
- Romario Kortzorg – Botev Plovdiv 2013–2014
- Mitchell Burgzorg – Ludogorets Razgrad 2012–2014, Slavia Sofia 2014–2015
- Rodney Klooster – Botev Plovdiv 2019
- Menno Koch – CSKA Sofia 2021–
- Quido Lanzaat – CSKA Sofia 2007–08
- Elvis Manu – Ludogorets Razgrad 2020–2022
- Ludcinio Marengo – Tsarsko Selo 2020
- Jurgen Mattheij – CSKA Sofia 2020–
- Dylan Mertens – Tsarsko Selo, Botev Plovdiv 2020–
- Gregory Nelson – CSKA Sofia (2010–2012) – Botev Plovdiv (2015–2016)
- Randy Onuoha – Neftochimic Burgas 2016–17, Slavia Sofia 2019
- Sergio Padt – Ludogorets Razgrad 2021–
- Luís Pedro – Botev Plovdiv, Levski Sofia 2013–2015
- Lesly de Sa – Tsarsko Selo 2021
- Darren Sidoel – Arda Kardzhali 2019–20
- Andwélé Slory – Levski Sofia 2010
- Thijs Sluijter – Litex Lovech 2007–08
- Shaquill Sno – Lokomotiv Plovdiv 2021
- Stijn Spierings – Levski Sofia 2020
- Christian Supusepa – CSKA Sofia 2014–2015
- Jasar Takak – Etar 1924 2013
- Philippe van Arnhem – Botev Plovdiv 2019
- Stuart van Doten – Etar 1924 2013
- Jasper van Heertum – Botev Plovdiv 2022–
- Yanic Wildschut – CSKA Sofia 2021–2022

=== Niger ===
- Olivier Bonnes – Lokomotiv Plovdiv (2015) – Montana (2016)

=== Nigeria ===
- Tunde Adeniji – Levski Sofia 2016–18
- Kevin Amuneke – CSKA Sofia 2007
- Emanuel Baba – Cherno More, Levski Sofia, Spartak Varna 2002–2004, 2006–08
- Kasali Yinka Casal – Etar 1924 2012–2013
- Justice Christopher – Levski Sofia (2002–04)
- Victor Deniran – Slavia Sofia (2007–09) – Sportist Svoge (2009–2010) – Botev Vratsa (2011) – Montana (2012–2013)
- Richard Eromoigbe – Cherno More, Levski Sofia 2002–08
- Dino Eze – Beroe Stara Zagora (2004–06) – Lokomotiv Plovdiv (2006)
- Stephen Eze – Lokomotiv Plovdiv (2018–2019)
- Mustapha Abdullahi – Lokomotiv Plovdiv 2017
- Musa Muhammed – Lokomotiv Plovdiv 2017–18
- Chigozie Mbah – Slavia Sofia 2017
- Daniel Ola – Botev Plovdiv 2009
- Deniran Ortega – Spartak Varna (2007) – Slavia Sofia (2007–09) – Levski Sofia (2009)
- Ekundayo Jayeoba – Lokomotiv Plovdiv (2000–05) – Levski Sofia (2005–08) – Chernomorets Burgas (2008–09) – Vihren Sandanski (2009–present)
- Garba Lawal – Levski Sofia (2002–03)
- Stephen Sunday – CSKA Sofia 2014–2015
- Omonigho Temile – Cherno More (2002–03) – Levski Sofia (2003–04; 2006–07) – Chernomorets Burgas (2007–08) – Botev Plovdiv (2008–09)
- Shikoze Udoji – Vihren Sandanski (2004–06) – CSKA Sofia (2007–09)

=== Norway ===
- Liban Abdi – Levski Sofia 2014–2015
- Akinshola Akinyemi – Lokomotiv Plovdiv 2020
- Anwar Elyounossi – Botev Plovdiv 2021–
- Bjørn Johnsen – Litex Lovech 2015–2016
- Kai Risholt – Etar 1924 2013

=== Panama ===
- José Córdoba – Etar Veliko Tarnovo, Levski Sofia 2021–
- José Luis Garcés – CSKA Sofia 2007–08
- Romeesh Ivey – Etar Veliko Tarnovo 2021–

=== Paraguay ===
- Hugo Báez – CSKA Sofia 2009–2010

=== Peru ===
- Jean Deza – Levski Sofia (2016)
- Paolo Hurtado – Lokomotiv Plovdiv 2021

=== Poland ===
- Mateusz Bąk – Etar 1924 2013
- Marcin Burkhardt – Cherno More 2014–15
- Sławomir Cienciała – Etar 1924 2013
- Łukasz Gikiewicz – Levski Sofia 2015
- Jacek Góralski – Ludogorets Razgrad 2017–19
- Krzysztof Hrymowicz – Etar 1924 2013
- Daniel Kajzer – Botev Plovdiv 2017–19, 2023–24
- Kornel Osyra – Hebar Pazardzhik 2023–24
- Jakub Piotrowski – Ludogorets Razgrad 2022–
- Michał Protasewicz – Etar 1924 2013
- Damian Rączka – Lokomotiv Mezdra 2009
- Tomasz Sajdak – Slavia Sofia 2009
- Adam Stachowiak – Botev Plovdiv 2013–2015
- Patryk Stępiński – Lokomotiv Plovdiv 2025–
- Jakub Świerczok – Ludogorets Razgrad 2018–21

=== Portugal ===
- Marcio Abreu – Chernomorets Burgas (2007–2011)
- Dinis Almeida – Lokomotiv Plovdiv (2019–2021)
- João Amorim – Arda Kardzhali (2019)
- Diogo Andrade – Vihren Sandanski (2008–09)
- Leandro Andrade – Cherno More Varna (2020–)
- Ricardo André – Cherno More (2007–09) – Chernomorets Burgas (2010–2011)
- Rúben Brígido – Beroe Stara Zagora (2018–2019)
- João Paulo Brito – CSKA Sofia (2002–04)
- Jordão Cardoso – Cherno More Varna (2018)
- Tiago Costa – Vihren Sandanski (2007)
- Fabinho – Cherno More (2018)
- Filipe da Costa – CSKA Sofia (2008) – Levski Sofia (2009)
- Erivaldo – Beroe Stara Zagora (2020–21)
- Luis Dias – Vihren Sandanski (2007–08)
- Paulo Teles – Lokomotiv Plovdiv (2016–17)
- Pedro Eugénio – Beroe Stara Zagora (2012–2013) – Haskovo (2014–2015) –Cherno More (2015–2016) – Vereya (2016–17) – Beroe (2017–18) – Beroe (2019–20)
- Nuno Fonseca – Lokomotiv Mezdra (2009)
- Jose Emilio Furtado – Vihren Sandanski (2005) – CSKA Sofia (2006–07)
- Claude Gonçalves – Ludogorets Razgrad 2021–
- Pedro Lagoa – Etar Veliko Tarnovo, Botev Vratsa 2020, 2020–21
- Tozé Marreco – Lokomotiv Mezdra (2009)
- Rui Miguel – Lokomotiv Mezdra (2008) – CSKA Sofia (2009–2010)
- Fausto Lourenco – Lokomotiv Mezdra (2008–09)
- Mesca – Beroe Stara Zagora (2018–19)
- Filipe Nascimento – Levski Sofia (2018–2020)
- Pedrinha – Chernomorets Burgas (2010)
- Nuno Pinto – Levski Sofia (2011–2013)
- Nuno Reis – Levski Sofia 2018–2020
- Cristóvão Ramos – Levski Sofia 2011–2014
- Celso Raposo – Lokomotiv Sofia 2021–
- Tiago Rodrigues – CSKA Sofia 2017–2021
- Ruca – Beroe Stara Zagora 2022–
- Hugo Santos – Vihren Sandanski (2007–09)
- Josué Sá – Ludogorets Razgrad 2020–
- Sandro Semedo – Dunav Ruse (2019)
- David Simão – CSKA Sofia 2016–2017
- David Silva – Lokomotiv Mezdra (2008) – CSKA Sofia (2009)
- João Silva – Levski Sofia (2012–2013)
- Hugo Simoes – Lokomotiv Mezdra (2009)
- Eduardo Simões – Vihren Sandanski (2007–08)
- Rodrigo Vilela – Cherno More Varna (2020–)
- Nuno Tomás – CSKA Sofia (2019–21)
- Ukra – CSKA Sofia (2018)
- Vitinha – Ludogorets Razgrad, Cherno More Varna (2012–2018)
- Zé Gomes – Cherno More Varna (2021–)

=== Romania ===
- Ionuţ Bădescu – Naftex Burgas (2004–05)
- Alexandru Benga – Botev Plovdiv, Septemvri Sofia (2014; 2018–19)
- Florin Bratu – Litex Lovech (2010)
- Sergiu Buș – CSKA Sofia (2014) – Levski Sofia (2017–19)
- Costin Caraman – Dobrudzha Dobrich (1993–94)
- Alexandru Curtean – Botev Plovdiv (2014)
- Dragoș Firțulescu – Beroe Stara Zagora, Dunav Ruse, Slavia Sofia (2017–21)
- Alexandru Giurgiu – Slavia Sofia (2016–17)
- Petre Grigoraş – Levski Sofia (1993–94)
- Dragoș Grigore – Ludogorets Razgrad (2018–2021)
- Sergiu Homei – Neftochimic Burgas (2016–17)
- Claudiu Keșerü – Ludogorets Razgrad (2015–2021)
- Srdjan Luchin – Botev Plovdiv (2014) – Levski Sofia (2016–17)
- Cosmin Moți – Ludogorets Razgrad (2012–21)
- Cristian Muscalu – Chernomorets Burgas (2010)
- Ionuț Neagu – Cherno More (2019)
- Sergiu Negruț – Beroe Stara Zagora (2017–18)
- Emil Ninu – Levski Sofia (2014)
- Daniel Pancu – CSKA Sofia (2010)
- Georgian Paun – CSKA Sofia (2012)
- Alexandru Păcurar – CSKA Sofia (2012)
- Bogdan Pătraşcu – Litex Lovech (2000–01)
- Florentin Petre – CSKA Sofia (2006–08; 2009–10)
- Alexandru Piţurcă – CSKA Sofia (2006–07)
- Adrian Popa – Ludogorets Razgrad (2018–19)
- Andrei Prepeliță – Ludogorets Razgrad (2015–16)
- Florin Prunea – Litex Lovech (2000)
- Valeriu Răchită – Litex Lovech (2000–02)
- Laurenţiu Reghecampf – Litex Lovech (1998–99)
- Neluț Roșu – Levski Sofia (2017–18)
- Dorin Rotariu – Ludogorets Razgrad (2021–)
- Eugen Trică – Litex Lovech (2003–05) – CSKA Sofia (2005–07)
- Gabi Zahiu – Dobrudzha Dobrich (1993–95)
- Ianis Zicu – CSKA Sofia (2011)

=== Russia ===
- Aleksandr Bukleyev – Beroe (2008)
- Vladimir Gerasimov – Cherno More (2001–03) – Levski Sofia (2003–04)
- Konstantin Golovskoy – Levski Sofia (2002–04)
- Dmitri Ivanov – Vereya Stara Zagora 2019
- Konstantin Kaynov – Levski Sofia (2000–01)
- Sergey Kuznetsov – Volov Shumen (1994–95)
- Dar Korolev – Botev Vratsa 2020
- Yevgeni Landyrev – Litex Lovech (2003–04)
- Daniil Maykov – Slavia Sofia (2017)
- Denis Davydov – CSKA Sofia 2019–20
- Mikhail Maryushkin – Pirin Blagoevgrad (1993–94)
- Sergey Mironov – Sliven (2008–09)
- Anton Polyutkin – Montana (2016)
- Vladislav Radimov – Levski Sofia (2000–01)
- Serder Serderov – Slavia Sofia (2016–2017)
- Nikita Sergeyev – Slavia Sofia (2016)
- Oleg Shalayev – Slavia Sofia (2013–2014) – Haskovo (2014)
- Yevgeni Tyukalov – Slavia Sofia (2016)
- Ivan Selemenev – Dunav Ruse (2019)

=== Saudi Arabia ===
- Hussein Abdulghani – Vereya 2017–2018

=== Scotland ===
- Liam Cooper – CSKA Sofia 2024–25
- Tony Watt – CSKA Sofia 2019–20
- John Inglis – Levski Sofia (1999–00) – Botev Plovdiv (2001–02)

=== Serbia ===
- Milan Jokić – Tsarsko Selo 2021–
- Slobodan Rubežić – Arda Kardzhali 2021–
- Alen Stevanović – Tsarsko Selo 2021–
- Miloš Petrović – Lokomotiv Plovdiv 2018–2020, 2021–
- Aleksandar Stanisavljević – Slavia Sofia 2018–19
- Zoran Gajić – Arda Kardzhali 2019–20
- Nemanja Ivanov – Slavia Sofia 2018
- Dušan Mladenović – Etar Veliko Tarnovo 2018
- Miloš Cvetković – Levski Sofia 2017–2019
- Marko Adamović – Beroe Stara Zagora (2017–18)
- Nebojša Ivančević – Montana (2017)
- Đorđe Ivelja – Montana (2017)
- Bojan Jorgačević – Levski Sofia 2015–2017
- Pavle Delibašić – Lokomotiv Plovdiv (2008–09) – Minyor Pernik (2010)
- Zvonimir Stanković – Lokomotiv Sofia (2009–2010)
- Bratislav Ristić – Slavia Sofia (2009)
- Milan Milutinović – Lokomotiv Plovdiv (2008–09)
- Goran Janković – Minyor Pernik (2008–2011)
- Zoran Cvetković – Vihren Sandanski (2003–06) – Lokomotiv Mezdra (2008–09)
- Nenad Nastić – CSKA Sofia (2008–09)
- Pavle Popara – Slavia Sofia (2008–2013)
- Srdjan Novković – Slavia Sofia (2008–09)
- Igor Bondžulić – Lokomotiv Sofia (2008–09)
- Igor Tasković – Marek Dupnitsa (2007–09) – Beroe (2009)
- Zoran Belošević – Slavia Sofia (2007)
- Nenad Lazarevski – Slavia Sofia (2006–07)
- Aleksandar Mutavdžić – CSKA Sofia (2006)
- Oliver Kovačević – CSKA Sofia (2006–07)
- Vladimir Đilas – Marek Dupnitsa (2006–07) – Lokomotiv Sofia (2007–09)
- Dejan Maksić – CSKA Sofia (2005)
- Ivan Čvorović – PFC Naftex Burgas (2004–07) – Chernomorets Burgas (2007–08) – Minyor Pernik (2009–2012) – Ludogorets Razgrad (2012–2016) – Levski Sofia (2016) – Botev Plovdiv (2017–present) (Also holds Bulgarian citizenship)
- Vladan Milosavljević – Cherno More (2004–05) – Beroe (2008)
- Dragan Isailović – Litex Lovech (2004–05)
- Uroš Golubović – Spartak Varna (2003–04) – Lokomotiv Sofia (2004–08) – Litex Lovech (2008–2011) – Ludogorets Razgrad (2011–2013)
- Slavko Matić – Slavia Sofia (2003–04) – CSKA Sofia (2005–07)
- Saša Antunović – Spartak Varna (2002–04) – Lokomotiv Sofia (2004–08)
- Saša Bogunović – Litex Lovech (2002–03)
- Marko Palavestrić – Spartak Varna (2002–03; 2007–08)
- Gabrijel Radojičić – Belasitsa Petrich (2002–03)
- Saša Zimonjić – Levski Sofia (2002–03)
- Saša Simonović – Levski Sofia (2002–05; 2009–present) – Vihren Sandanski (2005–06) – Slavia Sofia (2006–08) – Lokomotiv Mezdra (2008–09)
- Velimir Ivanović – Slavia Sofia (2002–06) – Spartak Varna (2007–09) – Minyor Pernik (2009–2010)
- Darko Savić – Spartak Varna (2002–04) – Lokomotiv Sofia (2004–2011)
- Saša Viciknez – PFC Naftex Burgas (2002–05)
- Darko Spalević – Cherno More (2002–03) – Lokomotiv Plovdiv (2003–04)
- Budimir Đukić – Slavia Sofia (2001–05) – Spartak Varna (2007–08)
- Nenad Lukić – CSKA Sofia (2001–02) – Spartak Varna (2002–03)
- Miodrag Pantelić – Levski Sofia (2000–03)
- Mićo Vranješ – CSKA Sofia (2000–03)
- Rade Todorović – Slavia Sofia (2000–02)
- Dragan Žilić – CSKA Sofia (2000–01)
- Mile Knežević – Spartak Varna (2000–01)
- Kuzman Babeu – Slavia Sofia (2000–01)
- Miroslav Savić – Levski Sofia (2000–01)
- Miroslav Milošević – Cherno More (2000–04; 2005–07)
- Nebojša Jelenković – Litex Lovech (1999–08; 2009–2013)
- Ivan Litera – CSKA Sofia (1999) – Velbazhd Kyustendil (2000)
- Slavoljub Đorđević – Spartak Varna (1999–00)
- Dragoljub Simonović – Litex Lovech (1998–01) – CSKA Sofia (2001–02)
- Bratislav Mijalković – Spartak Varna (1998–99)
- Igor Bogdanović – Litex Lovech (1997–99)
- Vuk Rašović – Slavia Sofia (1997–98)
- Božidar Đurković – CSKA Sofia (1997–98)
- Saša Vukojević – Lokomotiv Plovdiv (1993–94)

=== Senegal ===
- Alioune Badará – Etar Veliko Tarnovo (2017–18)
- Stéphane Badji – Ludogorets Razgrad 2019–2022
- Papa Alioune Diouf – Litex Lovech (2011)
- Alioune Fall – Beroe Stara Zagora 2020–2022
- Ibrahima Gueye – CSKA Sofia (2001–06)
- Mansour Gueye – Lokomotiv Plovdiv (2016)
- Jackson Mendy – CSKA Sofia (2013–2014) – Litex Lovech (2014–2015)
- Mouhamadou N'Diaye – Dunav Ruse (2018–2019)
- Younousse Sankharé – CSKA Sofia (2020–21)
- Khaly Thiam – Levski Sofia 2018–2020

=== Sierra Leone ===
- Sulaiman Sesay-Fullah – Etar 1924 2013
- Alie Sesay – Arda Kardzhali 2019

=== Slovakia ===
- Tomáš Košút – Vereya Stara Zagora (2019)
- Martin Polaček – Levski Sofia (2018–19)
- Boris Sekulić – CSKA Sofia (2018–2019)
- Dušan Perniš – Beroe (2017–2021)
- Kristián Koštrna – Pirin Blagoevgrad (2016–2017)
- Marek Kuzma – Cherno More (2016–2018)
- Roman Procházka – Levski Sofia (2012–2013, 2014–2018)
- Peter Petráš – Levski Sofia (2010)
- Daniel Kiss – Levski Sofia (2008)
- Radoslav Zabavník – CSKA Sofia (2004–05)
- Ľubomír Guldan – Ludogorets Razgrad (2011–2013)
- Marián Jarabica – Ludogorets Razgrad (2011–2012)
- Jakub Hronec – Kaliakra Kavarna (2011–2012)

=== Slovenia ===
- Tadej Apatič – Slavia Sofia (2014)
- Roman Bezjak – Ludogorets Razgrad (2012–2015)
- Dejan Djermanovič – Litex Lovech (2011)
- Elvedin Džinić – Botev Plovdiv (2013)
- Suvad Grabus – Ludogorets Razgrad (2011)
- Denis Halilović – CSKA Sofia (2011)
- Marko Jakolić – Montana (2017)
- Sebastjan Komel – Cherno More Varna (2013)
- Dejan Komljenović – Lokomotiv Plovdiv (2009)
- Dino Martinović – Lokomotiv Plovdiv, Vereya Stara Zagora, Etar Veliko Tarnovo (2016–) (2018) (2019–20)
- Rene Mihelič – Levski Sofia (2013)
- Mitja Mörec – CSKA Sofia (2008) – Slavia Sofia (2009)
- Milivoje Novakovič – Litex Lovech (2005–06)
- Alen Ožbolt – Lokomotiv Plovdiv (2018–2020)
- Matej Poplatnik – Montana (2015)
- Aleksander Rodić – Litex Lovech (2006–07)
- Jure Travner – Ludogorets Razgrad (2011)
- Saša Živec – CSKA Sofia (2011)

=== South Africa ===
- Ricardo Nunes – Levski Sofia (2014)
- May Mahlangu – Ludogorets Razgrad (2018–2019)
- MacDonald Mukansi – Lokomotiv Sofia (1999–02) – CSKA Sofia (2002–03)
- Simba Marumo – Chernomorets Burgas (1999–00)

=== South Korea ===
- Lee Hyung-Sang – Spartak Varna (2008)

=== Spain ===
- Nacho Monsalve – Levski Sofia 2021
- Pablo Álvarez – Cherno More Varna 2021–
- Higinio Marín – Ludogorets Razgrad 2020–
- Paco Puertas – Etar Veliko Tarnovo 2020–21
- Julio – Tsarsko Selo 2020
- David Bollo – Slavia Sofia 2019
- Raúl Albentosa – CSKA Sofia 2019–20
- Jordi Gómez – Levski Sofia 2017–18
- Pirulo – Cherno More 2017
- Miguel Ángel Luque – Lokomotiv Plovdiv 2016–2017
- Añete – Levski Sofia 2014–2015, 2016–2017
- Marcos García Barreno – Beroe Stara Zagora 2016
- Miguel Bedoya – Levski Sofia 2014–2016
- Brian Oliván – CSKA Sofia 2014
- Cristian Hidalgo – Cherno More 2013
- Antonio Tomás – CSKA Sofia 2012
- Rubén Palazuelos – Botev Plovdiv 2012
- Toni Calvo – Levski Sofia 2011–2012
- Didi González – Slavia Sofia 2009–2010
- Francisco Martos – CSKA Sofia 2006–07

=== Suriname ===
- Shaquille Pinas – Ludogorets Razgrad 2021–

=== Sweden ===
- Jack Lahne – Botev Plovdiv 2022
- Kevin Höög Jansson – Botev Plovdiv 2021
- Mehmet Mehmet – Etar 1924 2013
- Sonny Karlsson – Etar 1924 2013
- Fredrik Risp – Levski Sofia 2011–2012
- Simon Sandberg – Levski Sofia 2016–2017

=== Switzerland ===
- Karim Rossi – Tsarsko Selo 2021
- Dragan Mihajlović – Levski Sofia 2021–2022
- Valentino Pugliese – Lokomotiv Plovdiv, Tsarsko Selo, Beroe Stara Zagora 2020–21, 2022–
- Miodrag Mitrović – Cherno More Varna (2019–20)
- Zoran Josipovic – Beroe Stara Zagora (2019–20)
- Davide Mariani – Levski Sofia 2018–19, Beroe Stara Zagora 2022
- Mihael Kovačević – Beroe Stara Zagora (2014)
- Giuseppe Aquaro – CSKA Sofia (2010–11)
- Baykal Kulaksızoğlu – Lokomotiv Sofia (2011)

=== Tajikistan ===
- Nuriddin Davronov – Dunav Ruse 2016–2017
- Iskandar Dzhalilov – Dunav Ruse, Lokomotiv Plovdiv 2016–2017, 2018
- Parvizdzhon Umarbayev – Lokomotiv Plovdiv 2016–

=== Togo ===
- Serge Nyuiadzi – CSKA Sofia 2012–2013
- Paul Adado – Litex Lovech, Vidima-Rakovski 2002–2005

=== Trinidad & Tobago ===
- Brent Rahim – Levski Sofia 2002

=== Tunisia ===
- Khaled Ayari – Lokomotiv Plovdiv 2017
- Aymen Belaïd – Lokomotiv Plovdiv 2013 – Levski Sofia 2014–2015, 2018-2019
- Tijani Belaïd – Lokomotiv Plovdiv 2013-2014
- Selim Ben Djemia – Vereya 2017–2018
- Mohamed Ben Othman – Lokomotiv GO 2016–2017
- Syam Ben Youcef – Beroe Stara Zagora 2022
- Lamjed Chehoudi – Lokomotiv Sofia 2014–2015
- Nader Ghandri – Slavia Sofia 2021
- Enis Hajri – Chernomorets Burgas 2009–2012
- Sofien Moussa – Lokomotiv GO 2016–2017
- Hamza Younés – Botev Plovdiv, Ludogorets Razgrad 2013–2015

=== Turkey ===
- Orhan Aktaş – Haskovo 2015
- Erol Alkan – Beroe Stara Zagora, Etar Veliko Tarnovo 2018–2020, 2021
- Güven Güneri – Akademik Sofia 2010
- Fatih Yılmaz – Etar 2013

=== Turkmenistan ===
- Igor Kislov – Etar 1990–96

=== Ukraine ===
- Oleksiy Bykov – Lokomotiv Plovdiv 2021
- Hennadiy Hanyev – Vereya Stara Zagora, Dunav Ruse, Beroe Stara Zagora, CSKA 1948 2019–
- Yevhen Borovyk – Cherno More 2017
- Yevhen Dobrovolskyi – Vereya Stara Zagora 2019
- Serhiy Doronchenko – Etar 1924 1993
- Oleksiy Larin – Dunav Ruse 2017–18
- Ihor Oshchypko – Botev Plovdiv 2016
- Oleksandr Koval – Levski Sofia 2000
- Oleg Morgun – Etar 1924, Levski Sofia (1991–1995)
- Ihor Plastun – Ludogorets Razgrad 2016–2018, 2021–
- Denis Prychynenko – CSKA Sofia 2014–15
- Serhiy Rudyka – Vereya Stara Zagora 2019
- Ivan Shariy – Etar 1924 (1989–1991)
- Eduard Tsykhmeystruk – Levski Sofia 2000–01
- Denys Vasilyev – Vereya Stara Zagora 2018–19

=== Uruguay ===
- Sasha Aneff – Botev Vratsa 2012–2013
- Nicolás Raimondi – Loko Plovdiv 2010–11
- Robert Mario Flores – Litex Lovech 2011
- Sebastián Flores – Cherno More, Botev Plovdiv 2009–2011
- Edgardo Simovic – Vihren Sandanski 2008
- Nico Varela – Botev Plovdiv 2015

=== Uzbekistan ===
- Fevzi Davletov – Belasitsa Petrich (1999–00)

=== Venezuela ===
- Adalberto Peñaranda – CSKA Sofia 2020–21
- Hermes Palomino – Cherno More Varna 2011–13
- Marlon Antonio Fernández – Cherno More Varna 2012
- Héctor Gonzalez – Chernomorets Burgas 2009–10
- Gabriel Cichero – Vihren Sandanski 2007
- Alejandro Cichero – Litex Lovech 2005–08

== Notes ==
1. Born in Angola
2. Born in Austria
3. Born in Belgium
4. Born in Bosnia and Herzegovina (then part of SFR Yugoslavia)
5. Born in Bulgaria
6. Born in Cameroon
7. Born in Cape Verde
8. Born in Croatia (then part of the SFR Yugoslavia)
9. Born in the Democratic Republic of Congo (then Zaïre)
10. Born in England
11. Born in France
12. Born in Germany
13. Born in Ghana
14. Born in Kosovo (then part of SFR Yugoslavia)
15. Born in Libya
16. Born in the Netherlands
17. Born in Nigeria
18. Born in Poland
19. Born in Portugal
20. Born in Romania
21. Born in Russia (then part of the Soviet Union)
22. Born in Senegal
23. Born in Serbia (then part of the SFR Yugoslavia)
24. Born in Slovakia (then part of Czechoslovakia)
25. Born in Slovenia (then part of the SFR Yugoslavia)
26. Born in Somalia
27. Born in Spain
28. Born in Suriname
29. Born in Turkey
30. Born in Uganda
31. Born in Ukraine (then part of the Soviet Union)
32. Born in the United Arab Emirates
33. Born in the USA
34. Born in West Germany (now part of Germany)
35. Capped for the Bulgaria national under-21 football team
36. Capped for the Bulgaria national under-18 football team
37. Capped for the Bulgaria national under-17 football team
38. Capped for the Bulgaria national under-16 football team
39. Capped for the Croatia national under-21 football team
40. Capped for the England national under-17 football team
41. Capped for the France national under-21 football team
42. Capped for the France national under-20 football team
43. Capped for the France national under-19 football team
44. Capped for the France national under-18 football team
45. Capped for the France national under-17 football team
46. Capped for the Netherlands national under-21 football team
47. Capped for the Netherlands national under-20 football team
48. Capped for the Netherlands national under-19 football team
49. Capped for the Netherlands national under-17 football team
50. Capped for the Netherlands national under-16 football team
51. Capped for the Portugal national under-18 football team
52. Capped for the Portugal national under-17 football team
53. Capped for the Russia national under-18 football team
54. Capped for the Spain national under-21 football team
55. Capped for the Spain national under-20 football team
56. Capped for the Spain national under-19 football team
