= Ademar Junior =

Ademar Junior or Ademar Jr. may refer to:

- Ademar José Tavares Júnior, Brazilian footballer
- Ademar Aparecido Xavier Júnior, Brazilian footballer
