= Richard Miranda =

Richard Miranda may refer to:

- Richard Miranda (politician) (born 1956), Democratic member of the Arizona Senate
- Miran (footballer) (born 1975), Brazilian football striker Richard Garcia Miranda, commonly known as Miran
