= Vladimir Kabranov =

Bulgarian footballer

Personal information
- Full name: Vladimir Kostadinov Kabranov
- Date of birth: 22 September 1986 (age 40)
- Place of birth: Petrich, Bulgaria
- Height: 1.86 m (6 ft 1 in)
- Position: Attacking midfielder

Team information
- Current team: Vihren Sandanski
- Number: 10

Senior career*
Years	Team	Apps	(Gls)
2004–2009	Belasitsa Petrich	69	(4)
2009–2010	Vihren Sandanski	25	(0)
2010–2013	Olympiakos Rodopoli		
2013–2014	Digenis Ano Poroia		
2014–2017	Belasitsa Petrich	42	(22)
2018	Bansko		
2018–2019	Belasitsa Petrich	42	(9)
2020–	Vihren Sandanski	0	(0)
- * Club domestic league appearances and goals as of 1 August 2020

Vladimir Kabranov (Bulgarian: Владимир Кабранов; born 22 September 1986) is a Bulgarian footballer who plays for Vihren Sandanski as an attacking midfielder.

== Career ==
Vladimir Kabranov is a son of Kostadin Kabranov - shooter number one of Belasitsa for all time in Bulgarian first division. Vladimir was raised in Belasitsa's youth teams. As an 18-year old in 2004 he signed his first professional contract and made his debut for the first team in the A PFG. In June 2009 he signed a contract with FC Vihren Sandanski.
