= Diarrassouba =

Diarrassouba is a surname. Notable people with the surname include:

- Bamba Diarrassouba (born 1989), French footballer
- Drissa Diarrassouba (born 1994), Ivorian footballer
- Lamine Diarrassouba (born 1986), Ivorian footballer
- Salifou Diarrassouba (born 2001), Ivorian footballer
