= Hugo Santos =

Hugo Santos may refer to:

- Hugo Santos (footballer, born 1972), Portuguese football player
- Hugo Santos (footballer, born 1978), Portuguese football player
- Hugo Santos (footballer, born 1983), Portuguese football player
