= OFC Belasitsa Petrich =

Bulgarian football club

OFC Belasitsa
- Full name: OFC Belasitsa Petrich
- Nickname: Komitite
- Founded: 1923; 103 years ago
- Ground: Stadion Tsar Samuil
- Capacity: 9,500
- Chairman: Ivan Zlatinski
- Head coach: Nikolay Dimitrov
- League: Southwest Third League
- 2025–26: Second League, 17th (relegated)
- Website: ofcbelasica.com
Home colours	Away colours	Third colours

OFC Belasitsa (Bulgarian: ОФК Беласица Петрич) is a Bulgarian football club from the town of Petrich, currently playing in the Second League. The team was founded in 1923. They play at the Stadion Tsar Samuil in Petrich, which has a capacity of 9,500. The club last played in the first tier of Bulgarian football during the 2008-09 season.

== History ==
=== Founding and early years ===
Belasitsa Petrich was founded in 1923 as FC Manush Voivoda. From 1957 the club was called DFS Belasitsa after the union of the local football clubs "Stroitel", "Cherveno zname", "Torpedo" and "Spartak", i.e. all the teams from Petrich.

=== First promotion to the top tier ===
In 1980, Belasitsa promoted to the A PFG for the first time ever. In its debut season in the Bulgarian elite in season 1980-81, the team finished in 13th place. In that same season, Belasitsa recorded its best appearance at the Bulgarian Cup, reaching the semifinals. They eliminated then holders of the cup, Slavia Sofia along the way. In the semifinal played on 22 April 1981, in Karlovo, Belasitsa lost to eventual winners Botev Plovdiv, by a score of 6–0.

During these years, Belasitsa earned themselves a reputation for playing very strong football for a team not based in a major city. The team relied almost entirely on youth academy players for the first team. They played in the Bulgarian elite up until season 1983-84, when they were relegated after playoffs, ending a four-year stint in the A Group.

=== Second promotion and golden era ===
Belasitsa returned to the A Group in 1999, ending a 15-year absence from the top tier of Bulgarian football. However, the team largely struggled and was eventually relegated back after just one season in the top level. In 2001, 2 years after their relegation from the top flight, Belasitsa returned to the top level through administrative decisions made by its owners. That year Belasitsa united with Hebar, who finished 9th in the 2000-01 season, which resulted in Belasitsa taking Hebar's place in the A Group, thus entering the elite once again. The team however, finished 13th during the 2001-02 season and was relegated back to the B Group.

A year later, Belasitsa returned to the top level, and began its best ever campaign in the Bulgarian elite, managing to stay 6 consecutive seasons, up until 2009. One of the reasons for such strong results during these years was that the team had brought a lot of talented Brazilian players, including Marcelo Vava, Dianu, Marquinos, and Eduardo Du Bala. In 2005, the team hired Macedonian coach Stevica Kuzmanovski, under whose guidance Belasitsa achieved its best ever result in the Bulgarian league, finishing in 6th place. Next season 2006-07, Belasitsa also performed strongly, finishing in 8th place.

However, after that season, a general decline started, as the team finished in 13th place during the 2007-08 season, saving themselves from relegation in the last round. Unfortunately for Belasitsa, they finished last during the 2008-09 season, thus being relegated.

=== Financial problems and relegations to lower leagues ===
After they were relegated to the B Group in 2009, it was discovered that the team was in serious financial and administrative irregularities, and their future was very unclear. Belasitsa could not register enough players for the 2009–10 B Group, so they were disqualified before the season started. They were administratively relegated to the V AFG for that season. In 2012, further economic problems began and the team was in danger from ceasing its operations. However, the team is eventually saved, with the financial support coming from the Municipality of Petrich. Belasitsa was further relegated to the fourth tier of Bulgarian football, the regional amateur league for the 2012–13 season. They achieved first place and were promoted back to the V AFG.

In the next few seasons, the club managed to rebuild their first team and returned to their original stadium, after it had license issues. In seasons 2020/21 and 2021/22, the team had largely fought for promotion to the Second League, but Belasitsa narrowly missed the first spot by a few points on both occasions.

Belasitsa had a strong 2021-22 season, finishing in first place in the Southwest Third League and clinching promotion to the Second League after several seasons in the lower leagues.

In 2023, the club celebrated its 100th anniversary.

== Honours ==
Bulgarian First League:

- 6th place 2005–06

Bulgarian Cup:

- Semi-finals (1): 1981

=== Previous names ===
- 1923–1928: FC Manush Voivoda
- 1928–1931: FC Lubomir Vesov
- 1931–1946: FC Macedonia
- 1946–1948: FC Ilinden
- 1948–??: FC Spartak

== Current squad ==
As of 5 March 2026

Note: Flags indicate national team as defined under FIFA eligibility rules; some limited exceptions apply. Players may hold more than one non-FIFA nationality.

No.	Pos.	Nation	Player
1	GK	BUL	Vladimir Ivanov (on loan from Septemvri Sofia)
4	DF	BUL	Dincho Yovchev
5	DF	BUL	Dimitar Yaramov
6	MF	BUL	Martin Todorski
7	FW	BUL	Zhivko Dimitrov
8	FW	BUL	Toni Tasev
9	FW	BUL	Kaloyan Krastev
10	MF	BUL	Asparuh Smilkov
11	DF	BUL	Dimitar Iliev
12	GK	BUL	Aleksandar Karparov
14	MF	BUL	Ivan Marchev
15	DF	BUL	Atanas Karachorov
17	DF	BUL	Ivan Filchev
18	MF	BUL	Georgi Karakashev

No.	Pos.	Nation	Player
19	DF	BUL	Hristo Petrov
20	DF	NGR	Daniel Ayomide (on loan from Vihren)
22	DF	BUL	Valentin Kostov
25	GK	BUL	Kostadin Kotev
26	MF	BUL	Kristiyan Valkov
28	DF	BUL	Viktor Ergin
55	MF	BUL	Aleksandar Yakimov
77	MF	BUL	Anton Karachanakov
88	MF	BUL	Petar Karaangelov
91	FW	NGR	Peter Ahisu
99	FW	BUL	Dimitar Ivanov
—	GK	BUL	Kiril Georgiev
—	MF	BUL	Dimitar Vasilev

For recent transfers, see Transfers summer 2025 and Transfers winter 2025–26.

== Goalscoring and appearance records ==
As of 30 September 2024

Most A PFG appearances for the club

Rank	Name	Appearances
1	(Bulgaria) Dimitar Karadaliev	108
2	(Bulgaria) Lozan Trenchev	105
3	(Bulgaria) Yordan Popov	101
4	(Bulgaria) Valeri Stoyanov	93
5	(Bulgaria) Aleksandar Vukov	86

Most A PFG goals for the club

Rank	Name	Goals
1	(Bulgaria) Kostadin Kabranov	22
2	(Bulgaria) Dimitar Karadaliev	19
3	(Brazil) Vavá	18
4	(Bulgaria) Georgi Bibishkov	16
—	(Bulgaria) Dimitar Dimitrov	16
6	(Serbia) Gabrijel Radojičić	13
—	(Bulgaria) Ivan Yanev	16

== Notable players ==
Had international caps for their respective countries, held any club record, or had more than 100 league appearances. Players whose name is listed in bold represented their countries.

Bulgaria

- (Bulgaria) Ventsislav Aldev
- (Bulgaria) **Dimcho Belyakov**
- (Bulgaria) Nikola Boychev
- (Bulgaria) Martin Deyanov
- (Bulgaria) Nikolay Dimitrov
- (Bulgaria) Zapro Dinev

- (Bulgaria) **Engibar Engibarov**
- (Bulgaria) Ventsislav Ivanov
- (Bulgaria) Vladimir Kabranov
- (Bulgaria) Atanas Karachorov
- (Brazil) (Bulgaria) **Marquinhos**
- (Bulgaria) **Veselin Minev**
- (Bulgaria) **Yordan Minev**

- (Bulgaria) **Mariyan Ognyanov**
- (Bulgaria) **Aleksandar Tunchev**
- (Bulgaria) **Preslav Yordanov**
- (Albania) **Ditmar Bicaj**
- (Brazil) Vavá
- (North Macedonia) **Zekirija Ramadani**

== Notable managers ==
- (Croatia) Stjepan Deverić **(2008)**
- (Kosovo) Naci Şensoy
- (Bulgaria) Miroslav Mitev **(2007)**
- (North Macedonia) Stevica Kuzmanovski **(2005–2007)**
- (Bulgaria) Petar Mihtarski **(2003–2004)**
- (Serbia) Slovomir Katic **(2002–2003)**
- (Bulgaria) Krasimir Chakarov
- (Bulgaria) Yordan Arsov
- (Bulgaria) Ludmil Goranov **(2000–2001)**
- (Bulgaria) Grigor Petkov **(1999–2000)**
- (Bulgaria) Vasil Metodiev
- (Bulgaria) Kiril Ivkov
- (Bulgaria) Pavel Panov
