= Martin Deyanov =

Bulgarian footballer

Martin Deanov Martin Deyanov
Personal information
- Full name: Martin Deanov; Martin Deyanov
- Date of birth: 17 January 1980 (age 46)
- Place of birth: Burgas, Bulgaria
- Height: 1.70 m (5 ft 7 in)
- Positions: Midfielder; striker

Senior career*
Years	Team	Apps	(Gls)
1998–2000	Pietà Hotspurs	48	(7)
2000–2001	Hebar Pazardzhik	30	(6)
2001–2005	Belasitsa Petrich	124	(9)
2005–2009	Pietà Hotspurs	84	(36)
2009–2012	Marsaxlokk	56	(13)
2012–2013	Balzan	32	(1)
2013–2014	Birzebbuga St. Peters	23	(9)
2013–2014	Ħamrun Spartans F.C.	10	(0)
2014–2016	Gharghur F.C.	47	(4)
- * Club domestic league appearances and goals

Martin Deanov (also Martin Deyanov or Мартин Деянов – born 17 January 1980) is a Bulgarian retired professional footballer. He spent most of his career in the Malta playing for Pieta Hotspurs, Marsaxlokk, Balzan, Birzebbuga St. Peters, Hamrun Spartans and Gharghur F.C., but also had spells in the Bulgarian Premier with F.C. Hebar Pazardzhik, F.C. Belasitsa Petrich and also in the U21 Bulgarian national team.

== Honours ==
- 2005–06 Maltese Premier Division second place Best Foreigner (Pieta Hotspurs)
- 2008–09 Maltese First Division second place Best Player (Pieta Hotspurs)
- 2009–10 Maltese First Division Champions (Marsaxlokk)
- 2009–10 Maltese First Division Best Player (Marsaxlokk)
