= Wiris =

Brazilian footballer (2000–2023)

Personal information
- Full name: Wiris Gustavo de Oliveira
- Date of birth: 4 July 2000
- Place of birth: Lima Duarte, Minas Gerais, Brazil
- Date of death: 19 November 2023 (aged 23)
- Place of death: Lima Duarte, Minas Gerais, Brazil
- Height: 1.75 m (5 ft 9 in)
- Position: Midfielder

Youth career
- 2018: Campo Grande
- 2018–2019: Lokomotiv Plovdiv

Senior career*
Years	Team	Apps	(Gls)
2019–2020	Lokomotiv Plovdiv	12	(1)
2021–2022	Fluminense	0	(0)
2023	AE Paracatu	5	(0)
Total		17	(1)
- * Club domestic league appearances and goals

Wiris Gustavo de Oliveira (4 July 2000 – 19 November 2023), commonly known as Wiris, was a Brazilian professional footballer who played as a midfielder for Bulgarian club Lokomotiv Plovdiv, Fluminense and AE Paracatu.

== Career ==
Born in Lima Duarte in the Brazilian state of Minas Gerais, Wiris was scouted by Júlio César, who invited him to join an academy run by former player Pedro Vicençote in Rio de Janeiro. He spent time in the academy between January and June 2018, also playing in the academy of Campo Grande.

Wiris signed with Bulgarian club Lokomotiv Plovdiv in July 2018, following a trial period. He scored his first and only goal for the club in a 5–2 win against Arda Kardzhali on 11 August 2019.

On his return to Brazil, he signed for Série A club Fluminense, being assigned to their under-23 squad. After two years with Fluminense, in which he made fourteen appearances for the under-23 squad, he joined Campeonato Mineiro Segunda Divisão club AE Paracatu, on the recommendation of their head coach, Tiago Miguel. He left Paracatu in October 2023.

== Death ==
On 19 November 2023 Wiris was involved in a traffic collision on a road near his hometown of Lima Duarte. He was pronounced dead on the scene, along with Maria Bernardete de Oliveira Figueira, a passenger in the other car, while an eight-year-old girl later died of injuries sustained in the accident.

== Career statistics ==
Appearances and goals by club, season and competition
Club	Season	League			State League		Cup (Note: Includes Copa do Brasil and Bulgarian Cup)		Continental		Other		Total	
Club	Season	Division	Apps	Goals	Apps	Goals	Apps	Goals	Apps	Goals	Apps	Goals	Apps	Goals
Lokomotiv Plovdiv	2018–19	First League	5	0	–		0	0	–		0	0	5	0
Lokomotiv Plovdiv	2019–20	First League	7	1	–		2	0	3 (Note: Appearances in UEFA Europa League qualification)	0	0	0	12	1
Lokomotiv Plovdiv	Total		12	1	0	0	2	0	3	0	0	0	17	1
Fluminense	2021	Série A	0	0	0	0	0	0	–		0	0	0	0
Fluminense	2022	Série A	0	0	0	0	0	0	–		0	0	0	0
Fluminense	Total		0	0	0	0	0	0	0	0	0	0	0	0
AE Paracatu	2023	–			5 (Note: Appearances in the Campeonato Mineiro Segunda Divisão)	0	0	0	–		0	0	5	0
Career total			12	1	5	0	2	0	3	0	0	0	22	1

== Honours ==
Lokomotiv Plovdiv

- Bulgarian Cup: 2018–19
