= Atanas Karachorov =

Bulgarian association football player

Personal information
- Full name: Atanas Angelov Karachorov
- Date of birth: 18 June 1998 (age 28)
- Place of birth: Petrich, Bulgaria
- Height: 1.74 m (5 ft 9 in)
- Position: Defender

Team information
- Current team: Belasitsa Petrich
- Number: 15

Youth career
- Belasitsa Petrich
- –2012: Spartak Plovdiv
- 2012–2018: Ludogorets

Senior career*
Years	Team	Apps	(Gls)
2015–2018	Ludogorets II	9	(0)
2017–2018	Ludogorets	1	(0)
2018	Spartak Varna	10	(0)
2019–2021	Belasitsa Petrich	70	(15)
2021–2022	Montana	21	(4)
2022–	Belasitsa Petrich	89	(0)
- * Club domestic league appearances and goals as of 1 June 2023

Atanas Karachorov (Bulgarian: Атанас Карачоров; born 18 June 1998) is a Bulgarian footballer who plays as a defender for Belasitsa Petrich.

== Career ==
=== Ludogorets Razgrad ===
On 28 May 2017, he completed his debut for the team in the First League for the 3:1 win over Cherno More.

=== Montana ===
In June 2021, Karachorov joined Montana.

== Career statistics ==
=== Club ===
As of 13 May 2018

Club performance			League		Cup		Continental		Other		Total	
Club	League	Season	Apps	Goals	Apps	Goals	Apps	Goals	Apps	Goals	Apps	Goals
Bulgaria			League		Bulgarian Cup		Europe		Other (Note: Includes Bulgarian Supercup matches.)		Total	
Ludogorets Razgrad II	B Group	2015–16	1	0	–		–		–		1	0
Ludogorets Razgrad II	Second League	2016–17	2	0	–		–		–		2	0
Ludogorets Razgrad II	Second League	2017–18	6	0	–		–		–		6	0
Ludogorets Razgrad II	Total		9	0	0	0	0	0	0	0	9	0
Ludogorets Razgrad	First League	2016–17	1	0	0	0	0	0	—		1	0
Ludogorets Razgrad	Total		1	0	0	0	0	0	0	0	1	0
Career statistics			10	0	0	0	0	0	0	0	10	0
