= Marcel Elame =

Cameroonian football defender

Personal information
- Full name: Jason Marcelo Elame
- Date of birth: 4 January 1982 (age 44)
- Place of birth: Yaoundé, Cameroon
- Height: 1.80 m (5 ft 11 in)
- Position: Defender

Team information
- Current team: Vereya Stara Zagora
- Number: 94

Youth career
- Fovu Club de Yaoundé

Senior career*
Years	Team	Apps	(Gls)
2001–2003	Fovu Baham		
2004–2008	Beroe Stara Zagora	51	(3)
2006–2007	Lokomotiv Plovdiv (loan)	25	(0)
2008–2009	Vihren Sandanski	11	(1)
2009–2010	Nesebar	14	(0)
2011–	Vereya Stara Zagora		
- * Club domestic league appearances and goals

Jason Marcelo Elame (born 4 January 1982 in Yaoundé) is a Cameroonian football defender who currently plays for Vereya Stara Zagora.

== Career ==
He moved with teammate Daniel Bekono in January 2004 from Fovu Baham to Bulgarian side PFC Beroe Stara Zagora, from July 2006 to June 2007 he was loaned out to Lokomotiv Plovdiv and played 25 games. After 1 year he returned to Beroe Stz. He left Beroe in July 2008 and moved to FC Vihren Sandanski. He also holds a Bulgarian passport.
