= Stadion Tsar Samuil =

Sports venue in Petrich, Bulgaria

Coordinates: 41°23′21″N 23°11′58″E

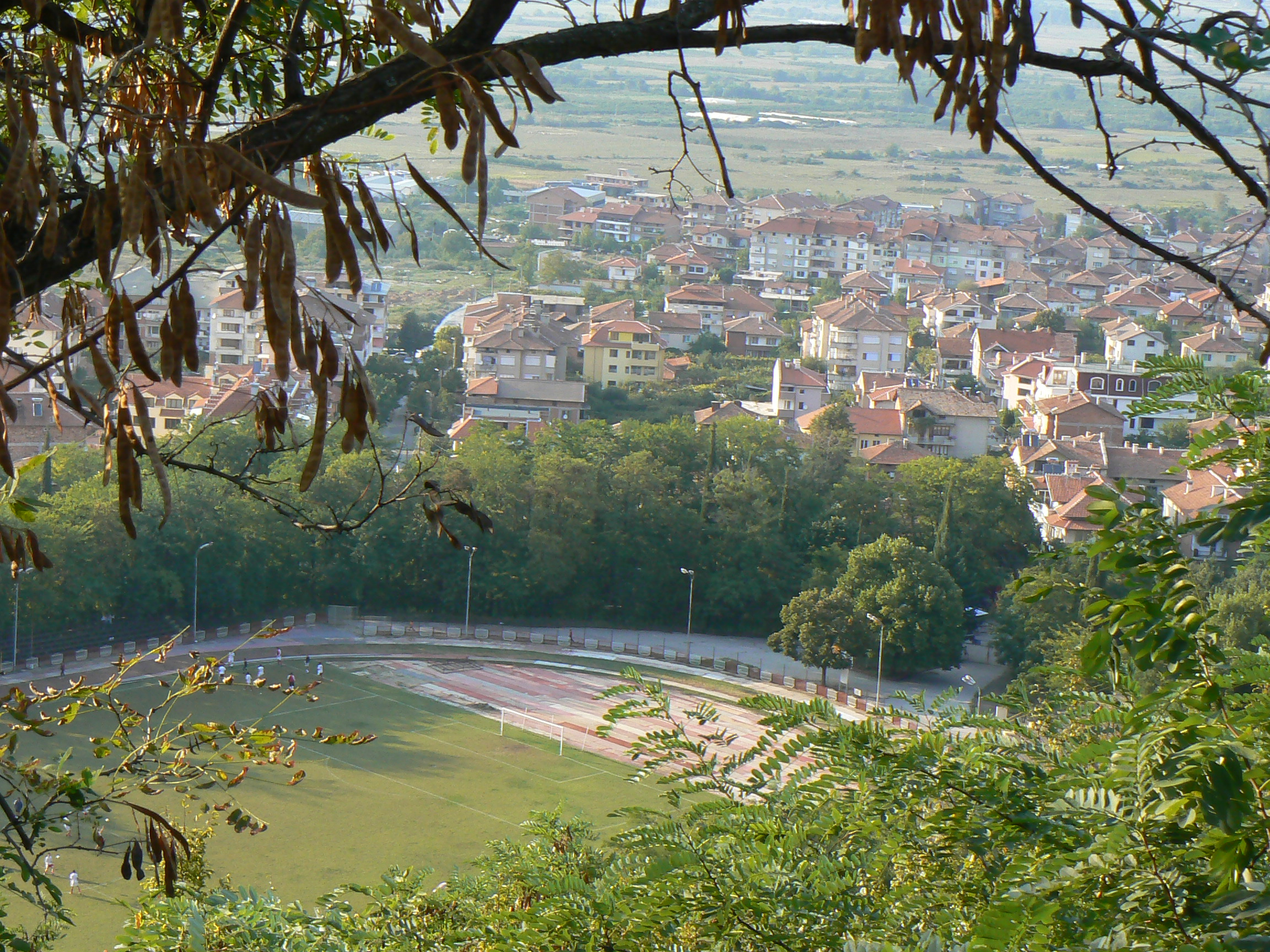
The stadium, as seen from the hill above

Tsar Samuil Stadium is a multi-purpose stadium in Petrich, Bulgaria.

It is currently used mostly for football matches and is the home ground of PFC Belasitsa Petrich.

The stadium holds 9,500 spectators.

The stadium is named after legendary Bulgarian medieval ruler Tsar Samuil.
