= Berthran Haktam =

Ghanaian footballer

Bernard Hagan
Personal information
- Full name: Bernard Hagan
- Date of birth: April 4, 1985 (age 41)
- Place of birth: Accra, Ghana
- Height: 1.86 m (6 ft 1 in)
- Position: Midfielder

Senior career*
Years	Team	Apps	(Gls)
2007 – 2010	Lokomotiv Plovdiv	39	(8)
- * Club domestic league appearances and goals as of January 1, 2008 ‡ National team caps and goals as of January 1, 2008

Berthran Haktam or English name Bernard Hagan (born April 4, 1985, in Accra) is a Ghanaian footballer.

== Career ==
=== Lokomotiv Plovdiv ===
Haktam made his official debut for Lokomotiv Plovdiv in a match against Cherno More Varna on 14 September 2007. He played for 24 minutes. Loko won the match 2:1 with Haktam making a good first impression.
