= Diogo Andrade =

Portuguese footballer (born 1985)

Personal information
- Full name: Diogo Manuel Bebiano Cepeda David Andrade
- Date of birth: 23 July 1985 (age 41)
- Place of birth: Lisbon, Portugal
- Height: 1.76 m (5 ft 9 in)
- Position: Midfielder

Youth career
- 1998–2004: Belenenses

Senior career*
| Years | Team | Apps | (Gls) |
| 2004–2005 | AFC Bournemouth | 0 | (0) |
| 2004–2005 | → Dorchester Town (loan) | 16 | (3) |
| 2005–2006 | Laval II | 15 | (0) |
| 2006 | Portimonense | 6 | (0) |
| 2007–2009 | UTA Arad | 4 | (0) |
| 2008–2009 | → Vihren (loan) | 5 | (0) |
| 2009 | Assyriska | | |
| 2009–2010 | Farul Constanţa | 13 | (0) |
| 2011–2012 | Varzim | 10 | (1) |
| Total | | 69 | (4) |

International career
| 2000–2001 | Portugal U16 | 7 | (3) |
| 2001–2002 | Portugal U17 | 3 | (0) |
| 2002 | Portugal U18 | 1 | (0) |
| 2003 | Portugal U19 | 2 | (0) |
- * Club domestic league appearances and goals

Diogo Manuel Bebiano Cepeda David Andrade (born 23 July 1985) is a Portuguese retired footballer who played as a midfielder (right or left).

== Football career ==
Born in Lisbon, Andrade played youth football with local C.F. Os Belenenses. In the 2004 summer, after not being offered a professional contract, the 19-year-old left the club and the country, joining AFC Bournemouth on trial. In late October, after being featured against Blackburn Rovers in the season's Football League Cup – penalty shootout win – he was loaned to another English side, Dorchester Town in the Conference South.

Andrade returned to Dean Court subsequently, hoping to earn himself a contract, which eventually did not happen. His next stop was Stade Lavallois in France, but he could only appear officially with the reserve squad.

Andrade only appeared in 15 league games in the following two seasons combined, representing successively Portimonense SC, FC UTA Arad (in January 2007, he signed a three-year contract with the Marius Lăcătuș-led team) and FC Vihren Sandanski, the latter two being his first experiences in top division football. After nearly one year of inactivity, he spent the 2009–10 campaign with another Romanian club, FC Farul Constanţa from Liga II; additionally, in August 2008, he had an unsuccessful trial with Oxford United.

In the summer of 2011, after another extensive period in free agency, Andrade returned to his country and joined Varzim S.C. in the third division, appearing sparingly as the season ended in championship win and promotion and retiring shortly after, at only 27.
