= Vavá (footballer, born 1976) =

Brazilian/Bulgarian footballer

Personal information
- Full name: Marcelo Gonçalves Vieira
- Date of birth: 25 July 1976 (age 50)
- Place of birth: Minas Gerais, Brazil
- Height: 1.76 m (5 ft 9 in)
- Position: Striker

Senior career*
Years	Team	Apps	(Gls)
1998–2000	Marechal Cândido Rondon	?	(?)
2000–2002	Belasitsa Petrich	3	(0)
2002–2003	→ Levski Sofia (loan)	19	(4)
2003–2008	Belasitsa Petrich	71	(15)
- * Club domestic league appearances and goals

Marcelo Gonçalves Vieira (born 25 July 1976, in Minas Gerais), commonly known as Vavá, is a retired Brazilian footballer who holds a Bulgarian passport as well. He used to play for PFC Belasitsa Petrich and Levski Sofia in Bulgaria. On 31 October 2002, he was sent off in the 0:1 away loss against Austrian side Sturm Graz in the third round of the UEFA Cup only two minutes after coming on as a substitute.
