= Dimitrios Zografakis =

Greek footballer (born 1978)

Personal information
- Date of birth: 3 August 1978 (age 48)
- Place of birth: Kavala, Greece
- Height: 1.83 m (6 ft 0 in)
- Position: Midfielder

Senior career*
Years	Team	Apps	(Gls)
1996–1998	Orfeas Eleftheroupolis		
1998–2005	Skoda Xanthi		
2005	PAOK		
2005–2006	Panionios	9	(2)
2006–2007	AEK Larnaca		
2007–2008	Ionikos	8	(1)
2009	Vihren	11	(4)
- * Club domestic league appearances and goals as of January 2009

Dimitrios Zografakis (Greek: Δημήτριος Ζωγραφάκης; born 3 August 1978) is a Greek former professional footballer who played as a midfielder.

Zografakis started his career at amateur football club FC Orfeas Eleftheroupolis. at the age of 20, Dimitrios signed with Skoda Xanthi and played for the team for seven years. In 2005 Zografakis spent ten months at PAOK. While playing for the club from Thessaloniki he made one appearance during the group stage of the UEFA Cup against Shakhtar Donetsk. After that he played for Panionios, AEK Larnaca and Ionikos. On 8 January 2009, Zografakis signed with Bulgarian side FC Vihren Sandanski. He made his team debut a few days later, in a friendly match against Lokomotiv Plovdiv.
