= Florian Lucchini =

French retired footballer (born 1981)

Personal information
- Full name: Florian Pier Francis Lucchini
- Date of birth: 13 February 1981 (age 45)
- Place of birth: Perpignan, France
- Height: 1.84 m (6 ft 0 in)
- Position: Goalkeeper

Youth career
- 1998–2000: Stade Rennais

Senior career*
Years	Team	Apps	(Gls)
2001–2002	GFCO Ajaccio	?	(?)
2002–2006	AC Ajaccio	5	(0)
2006–2007	AEP Paphos	7	(0)
2007	Ionikos FC	11	(0)
2008–2009	Vihren	25	(0)
2009–2010	AEP Paphos	17	(0)
2010–2012	Lokomotiv Plovdiv	35	(0)
2012–2013	Panserraikos	8	(0)
- * Club domestic league appearances and goals

Florian Lucchini (born 13 February 1981 in Perpignan) is a French retired footballer who played as a goalkeeper.

== Career ==
Lucchini started his career in Stade Rennais youth academy before joining Corsican sides GFCO Ajaccio and AC Ajaccio. In 2007, he played for six months in Ionikos FC and signed with Vihren for a free transfer in July 2008.

=== Vihren ===
Lucchini made his official debut for Vihren in a match against Levski Sofia on 9 August 2008. He played for 90 minutes. The match ended in a 1:0 win for Vihren. He made a phenomenal contribution to Vihren in the Bulgarian first division game against Levski and Sandanski fans named him The crazy Corsican. The Bulgarian variation of this name is Лудият корсиканец. In the 58th minute Lucchini saved a penalty kick.
