= Dimitris Karademitros =

Greek footballer

Personal information
- Full name: Dimitrios Karademitros
- Date of birth: 6 May 1983 (age 43)
- Place of birth: Athens, Greece
- Height: 1.80 m (5 ft 11 in)
- Position: Midfielder

Senior career*
Years	Team	Apps	(Gls)
2002–2003	Olympiacos Volos	28	(2)
2003–2005	Apollon Smyrnis	52	(4)
2005–2007	Ionikos	3	(0)
2006	→ Ethnikos Piraeus (loan)	9	(1)
2007–2009	Vihren Sandanski	26	(3)
2009–2010	Atsalenios	30	(6)
2010–2013	Apollon Smyrnis	26	(2)
2013–2014	Kerkyra	19	(7)
2014	Ermionida	4	(0)
2014–2015	Apollon Smyrnis	18	(2)
- * Club domestic league appearances and goals as of 31 May 2011

Dimitris Karademitros (Greek: Δημήτρης Καραδέμητρος; born 6 May 1983) is a Greek footballer. A right-sided winger, he is known for his speed, as well as his remarkable dribbling skills and scoring capabilities.

== Career ==
Karademitros began his career in Olympiacos Volos. In January 2005, he moved to Nikaia and signed with Ionikos. As of July 2010, he plays for Apollon Smyrnis.
