= Tiago Costa (Portuguese footballer) =

Portuguese footballer

Personal information
- Full name: Tiago José Ribeiro Costa
- Date of birth: 22 April 1985 (age 41)
- Place of birth: Lisbon, Portugal
- Height: 1.71 m (5 ft 7 in)
- Position: Right back

Team information
- Current team: Povoense

Youth career
- 1994–1997: CF Santa Iria
- 1997–1998: Benfica
- 1998–1999: Alverca
- 1999–2004: Benfica

Senior career*
Years	Team	Apps	(Gls)
2004–2006	Benfica B	30	(1)
2006	Hearts	1	(0)
2006–2007	Vitória Setúbal B	33	(2)
2007–2008	Vihren	6	(0)
2008–2009	Varzim	14	(2)
2009	Vizela	2	(0)
2010	Politehnica Timișoara	0	(0)
2010–2011	Estoril	16	(2)
2011–2012	Rio Ave	1	(0)
2011–2012	→ Leixões (loan)	8	(0)
2012–2013	Olympiakos Nicosia	17	(0)
2013	Hapoel Tel Aviv	12	(0)
2013–2014	Doxa	6	(0)
2014–2016	Académico Viseu	53	(0)
2016–2017	Mafra	22	(0)
2020–2021	Povoense	8	(6)

International career
2003	Portugal U18	3	(0)
- * Club domestic league appearances and goals as of 17:21, 28 April 2021 (UTC)

Tiago José Ribeiro Costa (born 22 April 1985) is a Portuguese former professional footballer.

== Club career ==
Born in Lisbon, Costa started his football career with hometown's S.L. Benfica, but only appeared officially for the reserves. In the summer of 2006, he signed for Scottish club Heart of Midlothian, making his Scottish Premier League debut against Inverness Caledonian Thistle on 28 August. However, he failed to feature again for the team and was released on 13 November. Again in his homeland he represented Vitória de Setúbal, but again only competed with the B side.

In June 2007, Costa moved clubs and countries again, joining Bulgaria's FC Vihren Sandanski. He appeared in less than one fourth of the games as his team finished in tenth position in the First Professional Football League, and returned to Portugal where he successively played for Varzim S.C. and F.C. Vizela, respectively in the second and third tiers. On 20 May 2011, while at the service of G.D. Estoril Praia, he was suspended for four months after failing a drug test on 28 December of the previous year, in a match against S.C. Freamunde.

Costa signed for FC Politehnica Timișoara in Romania in January 2010 on a five-month contract, being released on 4 June after failing to make a single competitive appearance and moving to G.D. Estoril Praia shortly after. He started 2011–12 in his country's Primeira Liga with Rio Ave FC, but returned to division two in the following transfer window, joining Leixões S.C. on loan.
