= Hugo Santos (footballer, born 1978) =

Portuguese footballer

Personal information
- Full name: Hugo Filipe Ferreira dos Santos
- Date of birth: 27 January 1978 (age 48)
- Place of birth: Alverca do Ribatejo, Portugal
- Height: 1.72 m (5 ft 8 in)
- Position: Winger

Youth career
- 1987–1989: Alhandra
- 1989–1992: Benfica
- 1992–1993: Alverca
- 1993–1994: Benfica
- 1994–1997: Alverca

Senior career*
Years	Team	Apps	(Gls)
1997–2003	Alverca	19	(0)
1998–1999	→ Seixal (loan)	10	(0)
1999–2000	→ Olivais Moscavide (loan)		
2001–2002	→ Olivais Moscavide (loan)	35	(9)
2003–2004	Olivais Moscavide	19	(6)
2004–2005	Estoril	46	(6)
2006	Olhanense	7	(0)
2006–2007	Olivais Moscavide	0	(0)
2007–2009	Vihren Sandanski	48	(7)
2009–2010	Mafra	6	(0)
Total		190	(28)
- * Club domestic league appearances and goals

Hugo Filipe Ferreira dos Santos (born 27 January 1978) is a retired Portuguese footballer who played as a left winger.

== Football career ==
Born in Alverca do Ribatejo, Vila Franca de Xira, Santos spent several seasons with hometown club F.C. Alverca, but appeared sparingly for the team, also being loaned twice to C.D. Olivais e Moscavide. He was part of one Primeira Liga roster whilst under contract, but after no matches in the competition he was released in 2003.

Santos then signed for G.D. Estoril-Praia, playing 27 scoreless games in his second season as the club suffered top level relegation. In January 2006 he left for S.C. Olhanense in Segunda Liga and, after a few months, was loaned to former team Moscavide also in that category, failing to make a competitive appearance and also being relegated.

In the summer of 2007, aged 29, Santos had his first abroad experience, joining FC Vihren Sandanski in Bulgaria. After suffering A Football Group relegation in his second year, he returned to his country and signed with yet another side in the Lisbon area, C.D. Mafra, retiring at the end of the campaign.
