= Luís Dias (footballer, born 1981) =

Portuguese footballer

Personal information
- Full name: Luís Filipe Veiga Dias
- Date of birth: 8 May 1981 (age 45)
- Place of birth: Lisbon, Portugal
- Height: 1.76 m (5 ft 9 in)
- Position: Right-back

Youth career
- 1992–1994: Futsal
- 1994–1998: Odivelas
- 1998–2000: Sporting CP

Senior career*
Years	Team	Apps	(Gls)
2000–2002	Sporting CP B	64	(5)
2002–2003	Estrela Portalegre	31	(7)
2003–2004	União Lamas	31	(5)
2004–2007	Olivais Moscavide	59	(1)
2007	Vihren	3	(0)
2008	Olivais Moscavide	6	(0)
2008–2010	Gloria Buzău	34	(2)
2010–2014	Atlético	124	(1)
2014–2016	Cova Piedade	59	(3)
Total		411	(24)
- * Club domestic league appearances and goals

Luís Filipe Veiga Dias (born 8 May 1981) is a Portuguese former professional footballer who played mainly as a right-back.

== Club career ==
Born in Lisbon, Dias spent four years with local and national giants Sporting CP (youth teams included), but could never appear for more than the reserves as a senior. He first competed in the second division at the age of already 25, with neighbours C.D. Olivais e Moscavide, playing 15 games as the team was immediately relegated to the third tier.

In the following years, Dias played in Bulgaria – only a couple of months, after which he returned to his previous club – and Romania, spending the 2009–10 season with FC Gloria Buzău in Liga II. In summer 2010 he returned to his country and joined another side from the capital, Atlético Clube de Portugal, appearing in all 30 matches in his first year as they were promoted to division two after an absence of several decades.
