= Rodolfo Lima =

Cape Verdean footballer (born 1980)

Personal information
- Full name: Rodolfo Manuel Lopes Lima
- Date of birth: May 8, 1980 (age 46)
- Place of birth: Cascais, Portugal
- Height: 1.74 m (5 ft 9 in)
- Position: Striker

Youth career
- 1991–1994: Estoril Praia
- 1997–2000: Alcoitão

Senior career*
Years	Team	Apps	(Gls)
2000–2001	9 Abril		
2001–2002	SC Lourel	31	(15)
2002–2004	Alverca	52	(15)
2004–2007	Benfica	0	(0)
2004–2005	→ Belenenses (loan)	26	(2)
2005–2006	→ Gil Vicente (loan)	24	(0)
2006–2007	→ Portimonense (loan)	28	(5)
2007–2008	Vihren Sandanski	15	(0)

International career
2006–2007	Cape Verde	7	(0)
- * Club domestic league appearances and goals

Rodolfo Manuel Lopes Lima (born 8 May 1980) is a former Cape Verde international footballer.

== Career ==
The striker signed with the Bulgarian club after canceling his contract with S.L. Benfica, а club he belonged to for the past three years but where he never played. He is known for his long runs and speed in which he currently has scored 5 goals in 28 games this season 06/07. He was born in Cascais Portugal but opted to play for his Parents land Cape Verde. He was born on May 5, 1980. Lima became the first footballer from Cape Verde to play in the A PFG.

Former clubs are C.F. Os Belenenses, Gil Vicente F.C. and Portimonense Sporting Clube, where he played loaned by S.L. Benfica. The Lisbon team signed the player after he conquered the Junior National League with FC Alverca.
