= Aleksandr Bukleyev =

Russian footballer

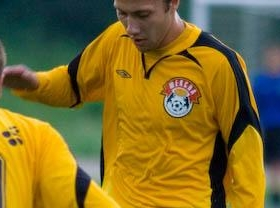
- Aleksandr Bukleyev in 2007

Personal information
- Full name: Aleksandr Sergeyevich Bukleyev
- Date of birth: 17 February 1984 (age 42)
- Place of birth: Samara, Russia, USSR
- Height: 1.85 m (6 ft 1 in)
- Positions: Left midfielder; winger

Youth career
- Krylia Sovetov

Senior career*
Years	Team	Apps	(Gls)
2002–2006	Krylia Sovetov (reserve)	101	(2)
2007	FC Sheksna Cherepovets	49	(2)
2008	Beroe Stara Zagora	14	(1)
2009	FC Ryazan	2	(0)
- * Club domestic league appearances and goals

Aleksandr Sergeyevich Bukleyev (Russian: Александр Серге́евич Буклеев; born 17 February 1984) is a former Russian association football midfielder. Bukleyev mainly played as an attacking left winger although he has played as an attacking left wing back in the past. He was also a very hard working player who often tracks back and was a solid marker and sliding tackler.

== Club career ==
Bukleyev began his career with FC Krylia Sovetov Samara's reserve team, before joining FC Sheksna Cherepovets in the Russian Second Division.

=== Beroe ===
Bukleyev moved to FC Beroe Stara Zagora for the 2008 season, and made his official debut for Beroe in a match against Levski Sofia on 8 March 2008. He played for 90 minutes. The result of the match was 0:1 with lose for Beroe. On 29 March 2008 he scored his first goal for Beroe against Botev Plovdiv, scoring in 79th minute. The result of the match 3:1 and win for Beroe.
