= Eduardo Simões =

Portuguese footballer

Personal information
- Full name: Eduardo Manuel Melico Simões
- Date of birth: 25 January 1982 (age 44)
- Place of birth: Lisbon, Portugal
- Height: 1.84 m (6 ft 0 in)
- Position: Centre back

Youth career
- 1991–2001: Benfica

Senior career*
Years	Team	Apps	(Gls)
2001–2005	Benfica B	17	(0)
2003–2005	Benfica	1	(0)
2003–2004	→ Amora (loan)	36	(2)
2005–2006	Olivais Moscavide	8	(0)
2006–2009	Mafra	65	(1)
2007–2008	→ Vihren (loan)	19	(0)
2009–2011	Real Massamá	60	(1)
2012–2013	Loures	31	(0)
2013	Libolo	?	(0)
2014	Loures	13	(0)
2014–2017	Alta de Lisboa	32	(4)
2017–2018	Pêro Pinheiro	8	(0)
Total		290	(8)

International career
1998	Portugal U15	10	(0)
1999	Portugal U16	12	(1)
2000	Portugal U17	6	(0)
2000	Portugal U18	2	(0)
2001	Portugal U20	1	(0)
- * Club domestic league appearances and goals

Eduardo Manuel Melico Simões (born 25 January 1982) is a Portuguese former footballer who played as a central defender.

== Club career ==
Born in Lisbon, Simões joined S.L. Benfica's youth system at the age of 9, and completed his development in 2001 by winning the under-19 championship. He was subsequently promoted to the reserves in the third division, making his debut on 2 September 2001 against A.D. Camacha. Despite being called up for the training sessions of the first team on several occasions in his first two seasons, he only played once for the main squad in official matches, on 1 June 2003.

In July 2003, Simões agreed to extend his contract until 2005, hoping to play in a more competitive league in the 2003–04 campaign were he not to remain with the roster. However, it was decided that he would be loaned to Amora F.C. of the third level, a move he disliked because he expected to play in the professional leagues: "When I renewed my contract, it was mentioned that I would be loaned to a team in the Primeira Liga or the Segunda Liga. That did not happen, but I will still present myself without any worries."

In 2004–05, Simões joined the first team pre-season in Switzerland, and Benfica attempted to find him a club in division two, but despite interest from Alverca F.C. he remained and returned to the reserve side for a further season. After his contract expired, he resumed his career in the third tier, with C.D. Olivais e Moscavide, C.D. Mafra and Real SC. This was interspersed with a brief stint in Bulgaria, with FC Vihren Sandanski.

Simões spent the vast majority of his remaining career in the Lisbon regional leagues, in representation of Grupo Sportivo Loures, União Desportiva Alta de Lisboa and Clube Atlético Pêro Pinheiro.

== International career ==
All categories accounted for, Simões earned 31 caps for Portugal at youth level. He represented the under-16 side at the 1999 UEFA European Championship in the Czech Republic, helping the country reach the quarter-finals; he was also part of the squad that failed to qualify for the 2000 edition.

In 2000, Simões appeared with the under–18s in the qualifying stages for the 2001 European Championships. The following year, he played under–20 football at the V Madeira International tournament.
