= Zoran Cvetković =

Serbian footballer

Personal information
- Full name: Zoran Cvetković
- Date of birth: 16 December 1976 (age 49)
- Place of birth: Niš, SR Serbia, Yugoslavia
- Height: 1.76 m (5 ft 9 in)
- Position: Defender

Senior career*
Years	Team	Apps	(Gls)
1994–1996	Železničar Niš	1	(0)
1996–1997	Temnić Lipa	10	(0)
1997–1999	Kolubara	27	(0)
1999–2000	Žitorađa	19	(1)
2000	Obilić	5	(0)
2001	Big Bull	16	(1)
2001	Balkan Bukovica	15	(1)
2002	Hajduk Beograd	8	(0)
2002–2003	Balkan Bukovica	9	(0)
2003–2006	Vihren Sandanski	83	(0)
2007	Panserraikos	18	(0)
2007	Kastoria	6	(0)
2008	Turan Tovuz	10	(0)
2008–2009	Lokomotiv Mezdra	21	(0)
2009–2011	Bdin Vidin	41	(2)
Total		289	(5)
- * Club domestic league appearances and goals

Zoran Cvetković (Serbian: Зоран Цветковић; born 16 December 1976) is a Serbian retired footballer who played as a defender.

Cvetković has previously played for Kastoria in the Greek Beta Ethniki and Vihren Sandanski in the Bulgarian A PFG.
