= Serhiy Doronchenko =

Ukrainian-Russian football player (born 1966)

Personal information
- Full name: Serhiy Viktorovych Doronchenko
- Date of birth: 26 November 1966 (age 59)
- Place of birth: Ordzhonikidze, Russian SFSR
- Height: 1.75 m (5 ft 9 in)
- Position: Midfielder

Senior career*
Years	Team	Apps	(Gls)
1983–1984	FC Kuban Krasnodar	3	(0)
1985	FC SKA Rostov-on-Don	1	(0)
1986–1987	FC Krylia Sovetov Kuybyshev	7	(0)
1987	FC Neftyanik Fergana	9	(0)
1987	FC Pakhtakor Tashkent	14	(0)
1988–1989	FC Kuban Krasnodar	58	(12)
1990	FC Lokomotiv Nizhny Novgorod	5	(0)
1991	Navbahor Namangan	39	(5)
1992–1993	FC Vorskla Poltava	56	(6)
1993	Etar Veliko Tarnovo	3	(1)
1994	FC Lada Togliatti	24	(0)
1995–1996	FC Vorskla Poltava	33	(1)
1996	FC Rubin Kazan	12	(0)
1997–1998	FC Elektron Romny	7	(0)
1998	FC SKA Khabarovsk	14	(2)
1999	FC Elektron Romny	28	(1)
2000	FC Naftovyk Okhtyrka	11	(0)
2000	FC Shakhter Karagandy	5	(0)

Managerial career
- 2008–2015: FC Kuban Krasnodar (director of sports)
- 2015–2016: FC Anzhi Makhachkala (director of sports)
- * Club domestic league appearances and goals

Serhiy Viktorovych Doronchenko (Ukrainian: Сергій Вікторович Доронченко; Russian: Серге́й Викторович Доронченко; born 26 November 1966) is a Ukrainian-Russian professional football functionary and a former player.

== Career ==
He started playing in professional football as part of FC Kuban Krasnodar in the First League of the USSR Championship. In 1985, spent one match in the major leagues for the SKA from Rostov-on-Don.

Since 2008, he has held the position of sports director in FC Kuban Krasnodar. In March 2011, he was embroiled in a scandal, after the former FC Kuban player Nikola Nikezić announced that he was forced to terminate the contract with his threats.
