= Mile Knežević =

Serbian footballer

Personal information
- Date of birth: 21 September 1971 (age 55)
- Place of birth: Belgrade, SFR Yugoslavia
- Height: 1.84 m (6 ft 0 in)
- Position: Defender

Youth career
- Partizan

Senior career*
Years	Team	Apps	(Gls)
1996–1997	Rad	8	(1)
1997–1998	Waregem		
1998	Puebla	4	(0)
1999	Rad	?	(2)
2000	Panserraikos	14	(3)
2000–2001	Spartak Varna	13	(4)
2001–2002	Zvezdara		
2002–2003	Szczakowianka Jaworzno	17	(5)
- * Club domestic league appearances and goals

Mile Knežević (Serbian Cyrillic: Миле Кнежевић; born 21 September 1971) is a Serbian retired footballer who played as a defender.

== Career ==
Norn in Yugoslav and Serbian capital Belgrade, Knežević spent his playing career featuring for clubs from many countries: FK Rad and FK Zvezdara in his home country, K.S.V. Waregem in Belgium, Puebla F.C. in Mexico, Panserraikos F.C. in Greece, Spartak Varna in Bulgaria and Szczakowianka Jaworzno in Poland.

After retiring in the early 2000s, he decided to start a coaching career, and in 2009, he became the sporting director of FK Internacional, a minor football club from Belgrade. Before he had been the manager of the youth team of FK Zvezdara.
