= Gastón Pisani =

Argentine-Italian footballer

Gastón Miguel Pisani
Personal information
- Date of birth: 6 December 1983 (age 42)
- Place of birth: Buenos Aires, Argentina
- Position: Midfielder

Team information
- Current team: Nuovo Campobasso Calcio-ITALIA

Youth career
- 1998–2003: Vélez Sársfield

Senior career*
Years	Team	Apps	(Gls)
2003–2004	Ituzaingó		
2004–2005	J. J. de Urquiza		
2005	Acassuso		
2006	Estácio de Sá		
2006	Olaria AC		
2007	AC Lagartense		
2007	Angra dos Reis		
2008–2009	Vihren		
2009	General Lamadrid		
2010	Nuovo Campobasso calcio-ITALIA		
- * Club domestic league appearances and goals

Gastón Miguel Pisani (born 6 December 1983), is an Argentine football midfielder with Italian citizenship.

Pisani played for several years in the lower leagues of Argentine and Brazilian football before joining Bulgarian club Vihren Sandanski.

In 2009, Pisani returned to Argentina to play for General Lamadrid.
