= Tiago Miguel =

Portuguese football manager (born 1979)

Personal information
- Full name: Tiago Miguel Gomes Fonseca Rodrigues Cardoso
- Date of birth: 22 November 1979 (age 46)
- Place of birth: Lisbon, Portugal

Team information
- Current team: Independente de Limeira (head coach)

Managerial career
- Years: Team
- 2021: VEC
- 2022: VEC
- 2022: Valeriodoce
- 2023: VEC
- 2023: VEC
- 2023: AE Paracatu
- 2024: VEC
- 2024: Três Corações
- 2025: VEC
- 2025: Jaraguá
- 2026–: Independente de Limeira

Tiago Miguel Gomes Fonseca Rodrigues Cardoso (born 22 November 1979), commonly known as Tiago Miguel, is a Portuguese football manager who is the current head coach of Independente de Limeira.

== Career ==
Born in Lisbon, Portugal, Miguel began his managerial career with local side CD Belas, managing the club's under-15 side in the 2012–13 season. Promoted to assistant manager of the under-17 squad the following year, he would move to Paraná, Brazil in 2019 to manage the under-17 squad of Maringá, also spending time at the Instituto Alex Santos.

His first senior role came when he was named head coach of Varginha Esporte Clube (VEC) on 25 June 2021. On signing, he was quoted as saying he was "very excited and a little anxious", and that VEC had an "ambitious project and that makes [him] super excited." In his first season with the club, he led them to the final of the Campeonato Mineiro Segunda Divisão, where they lost to Uberaba, but were still promoted to the 2022 Campeonato Mineiro Módulo II.

Having left VEC at the end of the 2021 season, he returned to succeed Diogo Tenuta in May 2022. One month later, it was announced that he would manage Valeriodoce starting in August, but under the unusual circumstances that Valério would be using the entire VEC squad and staff for their Campeonato Mineiro Segunda Divisão campaign. His first game at Valério was a 1–0 win over Contagem, before a good run of form saw the club reach the semi final of the Campeonato Mineiro Segunda Divisão, where they lost to eventual winners North.

He returned to VEC in February 2023 for his third spell in charge of the squad. However, in April of the same year he left the club after the management team cut twenty players from the squad, citing a lack of resources. He was replaced by Hadson, but after just two wins from his first six games, Miguel returned to manage the side in late May 2023. His first game in charge was a 3–1 win against Uberlândia on 28 May 2023, but he would end the year with AE Paracatu for their unsuccessful 2023 Campeonato Mineiro Segunda Divisão campaign.

He once again returned to VEC in February 2024. However, less than a month later he left the club, citing "personal issues." He would instead join Atlético Três Corações, though he only managed the team for two games – both losses – as the club only had eleven players available. In March 2025 he returned to VEC for the sixth time, with Osvaldo Lessa announced as his assistant. However, he was fired from his role after picking up just one point from his first four games. He was announced as the head coach of Campeonato Catarinense Série C club Jaraguá In June 2025.

In January 2026, Miguel returned to youth football as he was named head coach of the under-20 squad of Machado, Minas Gerais-based Villa Real. Initially planned to manage the club's first team in the second half of the year for the 2026 edition of the Campeonato Mineiro Segunda Divisão, Miguel would instead be named head coach of Campeonato Paulista Segunda Divisão club Independente de Limeira in March 2026. His career in São Paulo got off to a good start, as Independente picked up all eighteen points from their first six games. Having lead Independiente to the 2026 Campeonato Mineiro Segunda Divisão title, beating América 4–3 over two legs, Miguel was named manager of the year.

== Managerial statistics ==
As of 20 August 2026

Managerial record by team and tenure
| Team | From | To | Record | | | | | | | | PPM |
| Team | From | To | P | W | D | L | GF | GA | GD | Win % | PPM |
|---|---|---|---|---|---|---|---|---|---|---|---|
| VEC | 25 June 2021 | 31 December 2021 | 14 | 8 | 3 | 3 | 24 | 16 | +8 | 57.14 | 1.93 |
| VEC | 9 May 2022 | 31 July 2022 | 18 | 7 | 8 | 3 | 20 | 20 | +0 | 38.89 | 1.61 |
| Valeriodoce | 1 August 2022 | 30 October 2022 | 11 | 5 | 4 | 2 | 12 | 7 | +5 | 45.45 | 1.73 |
| VEC | 2 February 2023 | 28 April 2023 | 0 | 0 | 0 | 0 | 0 | 0 | +0 | — | 0.00 |
| VEC | 28 May 2023 | 17 June 2023 | 5 | 3 | 0 | 2 | 6 | 9 | −3 | 60.00 | 1.80 |
| VEC | 29 February 2024 | 20 March 2024 | 0 | 0 | 0 | 0 | 0 | 0 | +0 | — | 0.00 |
| Três Corações | 10 August 2024 | 13 September 2024 | 2 | 0 | 0 | 2 | 0 | 4 | −4 | 0.00 | 0.00 |
| VEC | 5 March 2025 | 19 May 2025 | 4 | 0 | 1 | 3 | 0 | 4 | −4 | 0.00 | 0.25 |
| Independente de Limeira | 10 March 2026 | present | 15 | 11 | 0 | 4 | 43 | 11 | +32 | 73.33 | 2.20 |
| Total | | | 69 | 34 | 16 | 19 | 105 | 71 | +34 | 49.28 | |
