= Ademar Xavier =

Brazilian footballer (born 1985)

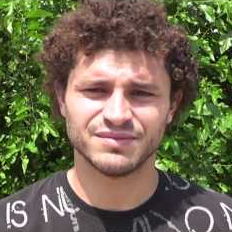

Personal information
- Full name: Ademar Aparecido Xavier Júnior
- Date of birth: 8 January 1985 (age 41)
- Place of birth: Arapongas, Brazil
- Height: 1.73 m (5 ft 8 in)
- Position: Midfielder

Senior career*
Years	Team	Apps	(Gls)
2005	Londrina	22	(15)
2005–2006	Vitória de Setúbal B	16	(5)
2006–2007	Vitória de Setúbal	5	(0)
2007–2008	Vihren Sandanski	10	(0)
2008	Rio Ave	2	(0)
2008–2009	Buftea		(1)
2009	Gloria Buzău	13	(0)
2009–2010	Deportivo Xinabajul		(5)
2010–2012	Milsami Orhei	51	(15)
2013–2014	Arapongas Esporte Clube	2	(0)
2014	Zimbru Chișinău	8	(4)
2014	Tiraspol	6	(0)
2015	Pelotas		

International career^{‡}
2001–2002	Brazil U16	7	(3)
- * Club domestic league appearances and goals as of 27 July 2017 ‡ National team caps and goals as of 27 July 2017

Ademar Aparecido Xavier Júnior (born 8 January 1985 in Arapongas), commonly known as Ademar Xavier, Xavier Ademar or simply Ademar, is a Brazilian footballer.

== Club career ==
He started his career in 2001 as a junior for Londrina F.C. in Brazil. He was quickly selected to play for Brazil under 16's in 2001, in an international championship in France. Ademar also played for Vitória F.C. (Portugal) and Bulgarian Vihren Sandanski between 2005 and 2007. From 2008 to 2009 played for Rio Ave (Portugal), C.S. Buftea (Romania) and Gloria Buzău (Romania). Joined Xinabajul in September 2009. Between 2010 and 2013 he played at Moldovan side FC Milsami Orhei. Since 27 February 2014 he plays at FC Zimbru Chișinău.

== International career ==
Played for Brazil in 2001 at the age of 16.

== Personal life ==
Ademar is the cousin of fellow footballer Juninho.

== Honours ==
Vitória de Setúbal

- Liga de Honra

Runner-up : 2007/2008

Milsami Orhei

- Moldovan Cup : 2011-12
- Moldovan Super Cup : 2012–13

Zimbru Chișinău

- Moldovan Cup : 2013-14
