= Bamba Diarrassouba =

French footballer (born 1989)

Personal information
- Date of birth: 29 March 1989 (age 37)
- Place of birth: Paris, France
- Height: 1.87 m (6 ft 2 in)
- Position: Centre-back

Senior career*
Years	Team	Apps	(Gls)
2010–2011	Saint-Brice		
2011–2012	Créteil B	2	(0)
2012–2015	Créteil	31	(0)
2015–2016	Fréjus Saint-Raphaël	19	(0)
2016–2017	Montana	20	(0)
2017–2018	Les Herbiers	1	(0)
2017–2018	Les Herbiers II	9	(0)
2018–2019	Chartres	18	(0)
2019–2020	AC Amiens	15	(0)
- * Club domestic league appearances and goals

Bamba Diarrassouba (born 29 March 1989) is a French former professional footballer who played as a centre-back.

== Career ==
On 19 October 2016, Diarrassouba joined Bulgarian First League side FC Montana, signing until the end of the season. He left the club in June 2017 when his contract expired. In the summer of 2019 Diarrassouba signed a contract with French club AC Amiens.

== Personal life ==
Born in France, Diarrassouba is of Ivorian descent.
