= Miran (footballer) =

Brazilian footballer (born 1975)

Personal information
- Full name: Richard Garcia Miranda da Silva
- Date of birth: 15 October 1975 (age 51)
- Place of birth: São Paulo, Brazil
- Height: 1.92 m (6 ft 4 in)
- Position: Centre forward

Senior career*
Years	Team	Apps	(Gls)
1999–2001	Sampaio Corrêa		
2001–2002	Braga	20	(5)
2002–2004	Estrela Amadora	56	(14)
2004–2005	Santa Clara	18	(0)
2005–2006	Beira-Mar	19	(3)
2006–2007	Portimonense	10	(0)
2007–2008	Vihren	13	(2)
2008–2009	Varzim	23	(1)
2009	Progresso	?	(3)
2010	Atherstone Town	1	(0)
2010–2011	Pinhalnovense	25	(6)
2011–2012	Progrès	21	(5)
2012–2013	Steinfort		
2013–2014	UNA Strassen	28	(7)
2015–2016	Mamer 32	34	(9)
- * Club domestic league appearances and goals as of 2 October 2016

Richard Garcia Miranda da Silva (born 15 October 1975), commonly known as Miran, is a Brazilian footballer who last played for Luxembourg club FC Mamer 32 as a centre forward.

== Football career ==
Born in São Paulo, Miran started playing organized football already well into his 20s. In 2001, he moved to Portugal and signed with S.C. Braga, being relatively used during his sole season as the team finished in tenth position.

Miran continued playing in the country in six of the following seven years, helping C.F. Estrela da Amadora promote to the Primeira Liga in 2003 with a career-best ten goals in 28 games. He also represented, always in the second division, C.D. Santa Clara, S.C. Beira-Mar, Portimonense S.C. and Varzim SC. In the 2007–08 campaign he played in Bulgaria, with FC Vihren Sandanski.

In late March 2010, after a brief spell in Angola, Miran joined English club Atherstone Town after his international clearance was granted. He made his debut as a substitute in a 0–1 home defeat against Woodford United, on 10 April.

After one season back in Portugal with lowly C.D. Pinhalnovense, Miran returned to top flight football in Luxembourg, with FC Progrès Niedercorn. He continued competing in the latter nation in the next years, representing SC Steinfort, FC UNA Strassen and FC Mamer 32.
