= OFK Vihren Sandanski =

Bulgarian football club

Vihren
- Full name: Общински Футболен Клуб „Вихрен“ Сандански; Vihren Sandanski Municipal Football Club
- Nickname: The Gladiators
- Founded: May 24, 1925; 101 years ago
- Ground: Sandanski Stadium, Sandanski
- Capacity: 6,000
- Chairman: Georgi Manolev
- Manager: Borislav Kyosev
- League: Second League
- 2025–26: Second League, 4th of 17
- Website: ofkvihren.com
Home colours	Away colours

OFK Vihren Sandanski (Bulgarian: ОФК „Вихрен“ Сандански) is a Bulgarian football club based in Sandanski, currently playing in the Second League. Sandanski's home ground is the Sandanski Stadium in Sandanski with a capacity of 6,000. Vihren Sandanski's team colours are green and white.

Vihren was founded in 1925, changing its name several times during its early existence. Up until the early 2000s, Vihren played mostly in either the second or third tiers of Bulgarian football. Season 2004–05 is arguably the most important in the club's history, as the team managed to promote to the A PFG, or first tier of Bulgarian football, for the first time. Vihren managed to play four consecutive seasons in the elite, before suffering relegation after the 2008–09 season. Since then, the Gladiators have played mostly in the third regional tier.

== Equipment ==
Currently the team's home kit is green and the away kit is white. Various combinations of green and white have been used through the years, but green remains the basic colour of the team.

== History ==
The club was founded on 24 May 1925. It has carried the names Ustrem, Gotse Delchev, Yane Sandanski and Cherveno zname throughout its history.

In 1977, Vihren first promoted to the B Group, remaining there 13 consecutive seasons before falling back to the V Group. In 1993, Vihren returned to the B Group, but only for one season, after which relegation again followed.

In 2003, Vihren again returned to the second level. In the 2004–05 season, Vihren finished first and gained promotion to the A Group for the 2005–06 season, marking the team's debut in the top tier. Before their first year of playing in A PFG, Vihren's owner decided to bring players from other countries to bolster the team's chances of surviving in the top flight. His first signing was the ex-FC Porto player Jose Furtado. He was from the Portuguese side G.D. Tourizense for free. Brazilian player Serginio Dias, and Portuguese players Mauro Alexandre and Nuno Almeida were just a few other players who signed for Vihren after Furtado. The team coach was named Petar Zhekov. Vihren finished season 2005–06 on 9th place in A PFG with 30 points.

The next season, 2006–07, Vihren managed to gain 37 points, finishing in 9th place once again.

In season 2007–08, Vihren's owner, Konstantin Dinev decided to bring Portuguese coach Rui Dias. The club signed eight Portuguese and two Brazilian players. But three months later, Rui Dias was discharged for poor results. At the end of the season, the team finished in 10th place.

Season 2008–09 started excellent with a 1–0 win against Bulgarian vice-champion Levski Sofia. In the 4th round, the club defeated Lokomotov Sofia. In January 2008, Vihren signed notable Greek players Christos Maladenis and Dimitrios Zografakis. In the end of the season, however, the team finished in 14th place and were relegated to B Group, ending a four-year stint in the elite.

The following two seasons were spent in the second tier, but financial problems overwhelmed the club, forcing its folding in 2011 and withdrawal from the B Group. The next season, Vihren was refounded from the fourth level, the A RFG. The team then promoted to the V Group in 2013.

In 2025, Vihren promoted to the Second League for the first time since 2011.

=== Honours ===
Bulgarian A PFG:

- 9th place: 2005–06 and 2006–07

Bulgarian Cup:

- quarter finalist Cup of the Soviet Army: 1985/86

== Players ==
=== Current squad ===
As of 5 July 2026

Note: Flags indicate national team as defined under FIFA eligibility rules; some limited exceptions apply. Players may hold more than one non-FIFA nationality.

No.	Pos.	Nation	Player
1	GK	BUL	Stanislav Nistorov
5	DF	BUL	Ivan Arsov
6	MF	BUL	Aleksandar Bastunov
7	MF	PLE	Monir Al Badarin
8	MF	BUL	Mario Ivov
9	FW	BUL	Kaloyan Krastev
10	MF	BUL	Tomi Kostadinov
11	MF	BUL	Daniel Pehlivanov
13	DF	BUL	Aleksandar Trenkov
15	MF	BUL	Ivan Lazarov
16	FW	FRA	Landry Malonda
17	MF	BRA	Léo Pimenta

No.	Pos.	Nation	Player
18	MF	BUL	Zhechko Zhelyazkov
19	MF	BUL	Aleksandar Veselinski
21	DF	BUL	Aleksandar Bashliev
22	MF	BUL	Anton Tungarov
23	FW	BUL	Daniel Manolev
25	DF	BUL	Atanas Kilov
26	DF	BUL	Kamen Hadzhiev
29	FW	BUL	Preslav Yordanov
73	MF	BUL	Ventsislav Bengyuzov
77	FW	BUL	Borislav Marinov
99	GK	BUL	Aleksandar Mihaylov

=== Foreign players ===
Up to five non-EU nationals can be registered and given a squad number for the first team in the Bulgarian First Professional League however only three can be used in a match day. Those non-EU nationals with European ancestry can claim citizenship from the nation their ancestors came from. If a player does not have European ancestry he can claim Bulgarian citizenship after playing in Bulgaria for 5 years.

EU Nationals

- (France) Landry Malonda

EU Nationals (Dual citizenship)

- (Palestine) (Bulgaria) Monir Al Badarin

Non-EU Nationals

- (Brazil) Léo Pimenta

== Managerial history ==
This is a list of the last ten Vihren managers:

Name	Nat	From	To
Kostadin Todorov	(Bulgaria)	January 2000	January 2001
Vasil Metodiev	(Bulgaria)	January 2001	June 2002
Yordan Bozdanski	(Bulgaria)	December 2002	May 2004
Petar Zhekov	(Bulgaria)	June 2004	May 2005
Petar Zhekov	(Bulgaria)	June 2005	May 2006
Dionysis Beslikas	(Greece)	June 2006	August 2006
Petar Zhekov	(Bulgaria)	August 2006	May 2007
Rui Dias	(Portugal)	June 2007	October 2007
Eduard Eranosyan	(Bulgaria)	October 2007	November 2007
Filip Filipov	(Bulgaria)	December 2007	March 2009

As of December 31, 2009.

== Notable players ==
- (Bulgaria) Vasil Metodiev
- (Bulgaria) Vladimir Karakachiev
- (Bulgaria) Todor Mechev
- (Bulgaria) Krasimir Bakalov
- (Bulgaria) Valentin Stankov
- (Bulgaria) Atanas Manushev
- (Bulgaria) Plamen Mitsanski
- (Bulgaria) Emil Mitsanski
- (Bulgaria) Hristo Zlatinov
- (Bulgaria) Pando Kotov
- (Bulgaria) Kiril Katzarov
- (Bulgaria) Ivan Stoyanov
- (Bulgaria) Bozhko Pandaziev
- (Bulgaria) Iliya Tochev
- (Bulgaria) Krasto Penev
- (Bulgaria) Evgeni Mihaylov
- (Bulgaria) Georgi Bachev
- (Bulgaria) Kiril Andreev

== Former foreign players ==
Brazil

- Serginio Dias
- Ademar
- Miran
- Mauro Alexandre
- Bruno Paes
- Manoel Da Silva

Cape Verde

- Rodolfo Lima
- Jose Furtado

Croatia

- Bruno Šiklić
- Vedren Muratović

France

- Florian Lucchini

Spain

- Sergio Ocana

Greece

- Christos Maladenis
- Dimitrios Zografakis
- Dimitris Karademitros

Hungary

- Zoltán Fehér
- Tihamér Lukács

(North Macedonia) Macedonia

- Slavcho Georgievski

Nigeria

- Shikoze Udoji
- Emejuru Okwudili
- Yusuf Bello

Portugal

- Eduardo Simões
- Diogo Andrade
- Luis Dias
- Nuno Almeyda
- Tiago Costa
- Paulo Teixeira
- Pina Semedo
- Mauro Almeida

Serbia

- Saša Simonović
- Zoran Cvetković

Uruguay

- Edgardo Simovic

Argentina

- Gastón Pisani

Venezuela

- Gabriel Cichero
