= 1993–94 European Cup Winners' Cup =

Tournament details
- Dates: 15 August 1993 – 4 May 1994
- Teams: 43

Final positions
- Champions: (England) Arsenal (1st title)
- Runners-up: (Italy) Parma

Tournament statistics
- Matches played: 82
- Goals scored: 234 (2.85 per match)
- Attendance: 1,232,562 (15,031 per match)
- Top scorer(s): Ivaylo Andonov (CSKA Sofia); Eoin Jess (Aberdeen); Ulf Kirsten (Bayer Leverkusen); Alon Mizrahi (Maccabi Haifa); 5 goals each

The 1993–94 season of the European Cup Winners' Cup was won by English club Arsenal, who beat defending champions Parma in the final. The tournament would be renamed to the UEFA Cup Winners' Cup the following season.

== Teams ==
Lithuania, Latvia, Estonia, Belarus, Croatia entered for the first time, as Czechoslovakia split between Czech Republic and Slovakia.

- (Albania) Albpetrol Patos
- (Austria) Tirol Innsbruck
- (Belarus) Neman Grodno
- (Belgium) Standard Liège
- (Bulgaria) CSKA Sofia
- (Croatia) Hajduk Split
- (Cyprus) APOEL
- (Czech Republic) Boby Brno
- (Denmark) Odense BK
- (England) Arsenal
- (Estonia) Nikol Tallinn
- (Faroe Islands) HB Tórshavn
- (Finland) MyPa
- (France) Paris Saint Germain
- (Germany) Bayer Leverkusen
- (Greece) Panathinaikos
- (Hungary) Ferencváros
- (Iceland) Valur
- (Israel) Maccabi Haifa
- (Italy) Torino
- (Italy) Parma
- (Latvia) RAF Jelgava
- (Liechtenstein) Balzers
- (Lithuania) Žalgiris Vilnius
- (Luxembourg) F91 Dudelange
- (Malta) Sliema Wanderers
- (Netherlands) Ajax
- (Northern Ireland) Bangor
- (Norway) Lillestrøm
- (Poland) GKS Katowice
- (Portugal) Benfica
- (Republic of Ireland) Shelbourne
- (Romania) Universitatea Craiova
- (Russia) Torpedo Moscow
- (Scotland) Aberdeen
- (Slovakia) Košice
- (Slovenia) Publikum Celje
- (Spain) Real Madrid
- (Sweden) Degerfors
- (Switzerland) Lugano
- (Turkey) Beşiktaş
- (Ukraine) Karpaty Lviv
- (Wales) Cardiff City

== Qualifying round ==
Team 1	Agg.	Team 2	1st leg	2nd leg
Karpaty Lviv (Ukraine)	2–3	(Republic of Ireland) Shelbourne	1–0	1–3
RAF Jelgava (Latvia)	1–3	(Faroe Islands) HB Tórshavn	1–0	0–3
Sliema Wanderers (Malta)	1–6	(Sweden) Degerfors	1–3	0–3
Bangor (Northern Ireland)	2–3	(Cyprus) APOEL	1–1	1–2
F91 Dudelange (Luxembourg)	1–7	(Israel) Maccabi Haifa	0–1	1–6
Valur (Iceland)	4–1	(Finland) MyPa	3–1	1–0
Balzers (Liechtenstein)	3–1	(Albania) Albpetrol Patos	3–1	0–0
Nikol Tallinn (Estonia)	1–8	(Norway) Lillestrøm	0–4	1–4
Košice (Slovakia)	3–1	(Lithuania) Žalgiris Vilnius	2–1	1–0
Lugano (Switzerland)	6–2	(Belarus) Neman Grodno	5–0	1–2
Publikum Celje (Slovenia)	0–1	(Denmark) Odense BK	0–1	0–0

=== First leg ===
15 August 1993
16:30

Balzers (Liechtenstein)	3–1	(Albania) Albpetrol Patos
Nushöhr 31'; M. Frick 53', 86'	Report	Poçi 37'

Sportplatz Rheinau, Balzers
Attendance: 1,600
Referee: Roman Steindl (Austria)

17 August 1993
16:00

RAF Jelgava (Latvia)	1–0	(Faroe Islands) HB Tórshavn
Kozlov 79'	Report

Daugava Stadium, Riga
Attendance: 500
Referee: Timo Keltanen (Finland)

17 August 1993
17:30

F91 Dudelange (Luxembourg)	0–1	(Israel) Maccabi Haifa
	Report	Mizrahi 38'

Stade Jos Nosbaum, Dudelange
Attendance: 1,363
Referee: Werner Müller (Switzerland)

18 August 1993
16:00

Karpaty Lviv (Ukraine)	1–0	(Republic of Ireland) Shelbourne
Yevtushok 84'	Report

Ukraina Stadium, Lviv
Attendance: 25,100
Referee: Andreas Georgiou (Cyprus)

18 August 1993
16:00

Publikum Celje (Slovenia)	0–1	(Denmark) Odense BK
	Report	Nedergaard 83'

Skalna Klet, Celje
Attendance: 3,311
Referee: Freddy Philippoz (Switzerland)

18 August 1993
16:30

Košice (Slovakia)	2–1	(Lithuania) Žalgiris Vilnius
Daňko 22'; Pobegayev 36'	Report	Maciulevičius 83'

Všešportový areál, Košice
Attendance: 6,000
Referee: Adrian Porumboiu (Romania)

18 August 1993
17:00

Sliema Wanderers (Malta)	1–3	(Sweden) Degerfors
Gregory 67' (pen.)	Report	Ottosson 7', 31'; Fröberg 52'

National Stadium, Ta' Qali
Attendance: 1,438
Referee: Brian Hill (England)

18 August 1993
17:00

Valur (Iceland)	3–1	(Finland) MyPa
Gregory 53', 58'; Lárusson 63'	Report	Rajamäki 33'

Laugardalsvöllur, Reykjavík
Attendance: 409
Referee: John Ferry (Northern Ireland)

18 August 1993
18:00

Nikol Tallinn (Estonia)	0–4	(Norway) Lillestrøm
	Report	Karlsson 6'; T. Gulbrandsen 10'; Schiller 39'; Bjarmann 44'

Kadriorg Stadium, Tallinn
Attendance: 992
Referee: Hans-Peter Dellwing (Germany)

18 August 1993
18:30

Bangor (Northern Ireland)	1–1	(Cyprus) APOEL
McEvoy 24'	Report	Sotiriou 44'

Clandeboye Park, Bangor
Attendance: 2,000
Referee: Roelof Luinge (Netherlands)

18 August 1993
19:00

Lugano (Switzerland)	5–0	(Belarus) Neman Grodno
Andreoli 37', 83'; Subiat 59'; Fink 68'; Penzavalli 85'	Report

Cornaredo Stadium, Lugano
Attendance: 6,000
Referee: Rémi Harrel (France)

=== Second leg ===
31 August 1993
16:30

Albpetrol Patos (Albania)	0–0	(Liechtenstein) Balzers
	Report

Qemal Stafa Stadium, Tirana
Attendance: 1,250
Referee: Darko Jamšek (Slovenia)

Balzers won 3–1 on aggregate.

1 September 1993
17:30

HB Tórshavn (Faroe Islands)	3–0	(Latvia) RAF Jelgava
	Report

Svangaskarð, Toftir
Attendance: 0
Referee: Piotr Werner (Poland)

Awarded. The match was never played due to RAF Jelgava's flight being cancelled. HB Tórshavn won 3–1 on aggregate.

1 September 1993
18:00

Lillestrøm (Norway)	4–1	(Estonia) Nikol Tallinn
T. Gulbrandsen 35'; Bergdølmo 38'; Mjelde 40'; McManus 74'	Report	Arendash 71'

Åråsen stadion, Lillestrøm
Attendance: 1,120
Referee: Andrew Waddell (Scotland)

Lillestrøm won 8–1 on aggregate.

1 September 1993
18:30

Žalgiris Vilnius (Lithuania)	0–1	(Slovakia) Košice
	Report	Ďurica 23'

Žalgiris Stadium, Vilnius
Attendance: 3,000
Referee: Svend Erik Christensen (Denmark)

Košice won 3–1 on aggregate.

1 September 1993
19:00

Maccabi Haifa (Israel)	6–1	(Luxembourg) F91 Dudelange
Mizrahi 26', 50' (pen.); Kandaurov 37'; Atar 55'; Holtzman 75'; Harazi 76'	Report	Urhausen 90'

Kiryat Eliezer Stadium, Haifa
Attendance: 3,500
Referee: Loris Stafoggia (Italy)

Maccabi Haifa won 7–1 on aggregate.

1 September 1993
19:00

Neman Grodno (Belarus)	2–1	(Switzerland) Lugano
Solodovnikov 60'; Mazurchik 69'	Report	Subiat 29'

Dinamo Stadium, Minsk
Attendance: 2,000
Referee: Václav Krondl (Czech Republic)

Lugano won 6–2 on aggregate.

1 September 1993
19:30

APOEL (Cyprus)	2–1	(Northern Ireland) Bangor
Mihajlović 15'; Pounas 69'	Report	Glendinning 4'

Makario Stadium, Nicosia
Attendance: 15,000
Referee: Itzhak Ben Itzhak (Israel)

APOEL won 3–2 on aggregate.

1 September 1993
19:45

Shelbourne (Republic of Ireland)	3–1	(Ukraine) Karpaty Lviv
Costello 9'; Mooney 67'; Izzi 76'	Report	Riznyk 86'

Tolka Park, Dublin
Attendance: 4,500
Referee: Philippe Leduc (France)

Shelbourne won 3–2 on aggregate.

1 September 1993
20:00

MyPa (Finland)	0–1	(Iceland) Valur
	Report	Lárusson 68'

Lahden kisapuisto, Lahti
Attendance: 1,039
Referee: Taras Bezubyak (Russia)

Valur won 4–1 on aggregate.

1 September 1993
20:00

Odense BK (Denmark)	0–0	(Slovenia) Publikum Celje
	Report

Odense Stadion, Odense
Attendance: 2,525
Referee: Léon Schelings (Belgium)

Odense BK won 1–0 on aggregate.

2 September 1993
19:00

Degerfors (Sweden)	3–0	(Malta) Sliema Wanderers
Ottosson 2'; Fröberg 14'; Ericsson 64' (pen.)	Report

Stora Valla, Degerfors
Attendance: 4,029
Referee: Karel Bohuněk (Czech Republic)

Degerfors won 6–1 on aggregate.

== First round ==
Team 1	Agg.	Team 2	1st leg	2nd leg
Tirol Innsbruck (Austria)	5–1	(Hungary) Ferencváros	3–0	2–1
Real Madrid (Spain)	6–1	(Switzerland) Lugano	3–0	3–1
APOEL (Cyprus)	0–3	(France) Paris Saint-Germain	0–1	0–2
Universitatea Craiova (Romania)	7–0	(Faroe Islands) HB Tórshavn	4–0	3–0
Lillestrøm (Norway)	2–3	(Italy) Torino	0–2	2–1
Valur (Iceland)	0–7	(Scotland) Aberdeen	0–3	0–4
Odense BK (Denmark)	2–3	(England) Arsenal	1–2	1–1
Standard Liège (Belgium)	8–3	(Wales) Cardiff City	5–2	3–1
Benfica (Portugal)	2–1	(Poland) GKS Katowice	1–0	1–1
CSKA Sofia (Bulgaria)	11–1	(Liechtenstein) Balzers	8–0	3–1
Panathinaikos (Greece)	5–1	(Republic of Ireland) Shelbourne	3–0	2–1
Bayer Leverkusen (Germany)	5–0	(Czech Republic) Boby Brno	2–0	3–0
Hajduk Split (Croatia)	1–6	(Netherlands) Ajax	1–0	0–6
Košice (Slovakia)	2–3	(Turkey) Beşiktaş	2–1	0–2
Torpedo Moscow (Russia)	2–3	(Israel) Maccabi Haifa	1–0	1–3
Degerfors (Sweden)	1–4	(Italy) Parma	1–2	0–2

=== First leg ===
14 September 1993
18:45

Bayer Leverkusen (Germany)	2–0	(Czech Republic) Boby Brno
Hapal 30'; Thom 66'	Report

Ulrich-Haberland-Stadion, Leverkusen
Attendance: 6,100
Referee: Juan Ansuátegui Roca (Spain)

14 September 1993
19:00

Degerfors (Sweden)	1–2	(Italy) Parma
Berger 72'	Report	Asprilla 87', 88'

Stora Valla, Degerfors
Attendance: 10,482
Referee: Ryszard Wójcik (Poland)

14 September 1993
19:45

APOEL (Cyprus)	0–1	(France) Paris Saint-Germain
	Report	Sassus 78'

Makario Stadium, Nicosia
Attendance: 9,675
Referee: Marnix Sandra (Belgium)

14 September 1993
20:00

Valur (Iceland)	0–3	(Scotland) Aberdeen
	Report	Shearer 8'; Jess 29', 56'

Laugardalsvöllur, Reykjavík
Attendance: 656
Referee: Michel Piraux (Belgium)

15 September 1993
17:00

Universitatea Craiova (Romania)	4–0	(Faroe Islands) HB Tórshavn
Craioveanu 47' (pen.); Gane 58', 70'; Călin 81'	Report

Stadionul Central, Craiova
Attendance: 1,897
Referee: Serdar Çakman (Turkey)

15 September 1993
17:15

Košice (Slovakia)	2–1	(Turkey) Beşiktaş
Daňko 71' (pen.), 78' (pen.)	Report	Sergen 2'

Všešportový areál, Košice
Attendance: 2,500
Referee: Veselin Bogdanov (Bulgaria)

15 September 1993
17:30

CSKA Sofia (Bulgaria)	8–0	(Liechtenstein) Balzers
Shishkov 12', 21', 54', 69'; Andonov 47', 50'; Nankov 68' (pen.), 88'	Report

Vasil Levski National Stadium, Sofia
Attendance: 6,200
Referee: Charles Agius (Malta)

15 September 1993
18:30

Torpedo Moscow (Russia)	1–0	(Israel) Maccabi Haifa
Borisov 88'	Report

Eduard Streltsov Stadium, Moscow
Attendance: 3,150
Referee: Kaj Natri (Finland)

15 September 1993
19:00

Lillestrøm (Norway)	0–2	(Italy) Torino
	Report	Silenzi 26'; Jarni 58'

Ullevaal Stadion, Oslo
Attendance: 5,026
Referee: Vladimir Ovchinnikov (Russia)

15 September 1993
19:00

Odense BK (Denmark)	1–2	(England) Arsenal
Keown 18' (o.g.)	Report	Wright 35'; Merson 68'

Odense Stadion, Odense
Attendance: 9,580
Referee: Ahmet Çakar (Turkey)

15 September 1993
19:00

Benfica (Portugal)	1–0	(Poland) GKS Katowice
Águas 86'	Report

Estádio da Luz, Lisbon
Attendance: 6,600
Referee: Karl Finzinger (Austria)

15 September 1993
19:15

Panathinaikos (Greece)	3–0	(Republic of Ireland) Shelbourne
Donis 13'; Saravakos 39'; Warzycha 48'	Report

O.A.K.A., Athens
Attendance: 18,310
Referee: Bernd Heynemann (Germany)

15 September 1993
19:35

Tirol Innsbruck (Austria)	3–0	(Hungary) Ferencváros
Daněk 48'; Westerthaler 58'; Carracedo 65'	Report

Tivoli, Innsbruck
Attendance: 6,505
Referee: Joël Quiniou (France)

15 September 1993
20:00

Standard Liège (Belgium)	5–2	(Wales) Cardiff City
Bisconti 13'; Wilmots 63', 84'; André Cruz 71'; Asselman 76'	Report	Bird 39', 62'

Stade Maurice Dufrasne, Liège
Attendance: 8,999
Referee: Eyjölfur Ólafsson (Iceland)

15 September 1993
21:00

Real Madrid (Spain)	3–0	(Switzerland) Lugano
Dubovský 44'; Míchel 67' (pen.); Fernandez 71' (o.g.)	Report

Santiago Bernabéu Stadium, Madrid
Attendance: 37,600
Referee: Dick Jol (Netherlands)

17 September 1993
20:15

Hajduk Split (Croatia)	1–0	(Netherlands) Ajax
Mornar 44'	Report

Bežigrad Stadium, Ljubljana
Attendance: 8,909
Referee: Fabio Baldas (Italy)

=== Second leg ===
28 September 1993
16:00

Maccabi Haifa (Israel)	3–1	(Russia) Torpedo Moscow
Mizrahi 6'; Pets 73'; Holtzman 85'	Report	Kalaychev 12'

Kiryat Eliezer Stadium, Haifa
Attendance: 9,500
Referee: Alfred Micallef (Malta)

Maccabi Haifa won 3–2 on aggregate.

28 September 1993
20:00

Cardiff City (Wales)	1–3	(Belgium) Standard Liège
James 59'	Report	Wilmots 13'; Lashaf 34'; Bisconti 50'

Ninian Park, Cardiff
Attendance: 6,096
Referee: Graziano Cesari (Italy)

Standard Liège won 8–3 on aggregate.

28 September 1993
20:15

Parma (Italy)	2–0	(Sweden) Degerfors
Balleri 3'; Brolin 68'	Report

Stadio Ennio Tardini, Parma
Attendance: 14,977
Referee: Oğuz Sarvan (Turkey)

Parma won 4–1 on aggregate.

28 September 1993
21:00

Paris Saint-Germain (France)	2–0	(Cyprus) APOEL
Le Guen 1'; Gravelaine 31'	Report

Parc des Princes, Paris
Attendance: 13,097
Referee: Hartmut Strampe (Germany)

Paris Saint-Germain won 3-0 on aggregate.

29 September 1993
15:30

HB Tórshavn (Faroe Islands)	0–3	(Romania) Universitatea Craiova
	Report	Gane 27', 32'; Vasc 70'

Svangaskarð, Toftir
Attendance: 275
Referee: Tore Hollung (Norway)

Universitatea Craiova won 7–0 on aggregate.

29 September 1993
17:45

Boby Brno (Czech Republic)	0–3	(Germany) Bayer Leverkusen
	Report	Kirsten 16'; Fischer 59'; Wörns 76'

Stadion Za Lužánkami, Brno
Attendance: 10,105
Referee: Stephen Lodge (England)

Bayer Leverkusen won 5–0 on aggregate.

29 September 1993
19:30

Aberdeen (Scotland)	4–0	(Iceland) Valur
Miller 51'; Jess 60', 69'; Irvine 65'	Report

Pittodrie Stadium, Aberdeen
Attendance: 9,912
Referee: Rune Pedersen (Norway)

Aberdeen won 7–0 on aggregate.

29 September 1993
19:45

Arsenal (England)	1–1	(Denmark) Odense BK
Campbell 52'	Report	Nielsen 86'

Highbury, London
Attendance: 25,689
Referee: Hans-Jürgen Weber (Germany)

Arsenal won 3–2 on aggregate.

29 September 1993
19:45

GKS Katowice (Poland)	1–1	(Portugal) Benfica
Kucz 45'	Report	Paneira 70'

Stadion GKS Katowice, Chorzów
Attendance: 4,320
Referee: Aron Schmidhuber (Germany)

Benfica won 2–1 on aggregate.

29 September 1993
19:45

Shelbourne (Republic of Ireland)	1–2	(Greece) Panathinaikos
Mooney 86'	Report	Georgiadis 26'; Saravakos 57'

Tolka Park, Dublin
Attendance: 1,500
Referee: Marek Kowalczyk (Poland)

Panathinaikos won 5–1 on aggregate.

29 September 1993
20:00

Balzers (Liechtenstein)	1–3	(Bulgaria) CSKA Sofia
Kuster 63'	Report	Andonov 32'; Tanev 53'; Ćirić 90'

Sportplatz Rheinau, Balzers
Attendance: 1,200
Referee: Georgios Michanikos (Cyprus)

CSKA Sofia won 11–1 on aggregate.

29 September 1993
20:00

Ajax (Netherlands)	6–0	(Croatia) Hajduk Split
R. de Boer 11'; Davids 37', 76'; Litmanen 56'; F. de Boer 61'; Pettersson 73'	Report

Olympic Stadium, Amsterdam
Attendance: 33,000
Referee: Patrick Kelly (Republic of Ireland)

Ajax won 6–1 on aggregate.

29 September 1993
20:00

Beşiktaş (Turkey)	2–0	(Slovakia) Košice
Tekin 45', 72'	Report

BJK İnönü Stadium, Istanbul
Attendance: 27,258
Referee: Lajos Hartmann (Hungary)

Beşiktaş won 3–2 on aggregate.

29 September 1993
20:15

Ferencváros (Hungary)	1–2	(Austria) Tirol Innsbruck
Détári 48'	Report	Westerthaler 19', 90'

Üllői úti Stadion, Budapest
Attendance: 14,972
Referee: Sergei Khusainov (Russia)

Tirol Innsbruck won 5–1 on aggregate.

29 September 1993
20:15

Lugano (Switzerland)	1–3	(Spain) Real Madrid
Subiat 61'	Report	Hierro 41'; Zamorano 77', 88'

Letzigrund, Zürich
Attendance: 4,500
Referee: Gerald Ashby (England)

Real Madrid won 6–1 on aggregate.

29 September 1993
20:30

Torino (Italy)	1–2	(Norway) Lillestrøm
Silenzi 45'	Report	Sinigaglia 48' (o.g.); Mjelde 58'

Stadio Delle Alpi, Turin
Attendance: 6,323
Referee: Leif Sundell (Sweden)

Torino won 3–2 on aggregate.

== Second round ==
Team 1	Agg.	Team 2	1st leg	2nd leg
Tirol Innsbruck (Austria)	1–4	(Spain) Real Madrid	1–1	0–3
Paris Saint-Germain (France)	6–0	(Romania) Universitatea Craiova	4–0	2–0
Torino (Italy)	5–3	(Scotland) Aberdeen	3–2	2–1
Arsenal (England)	10–0	(Belgium) Standard Liège	3–0	7–0
Benfica (Portugal)	6–2	(Bulgaria) CSKA Sofia	3–1	3–1
Panathinaikos (Greece)	3–5	(Germany) Bayer Leverkusen	1–4	2–1
Ajax (Netherlands)	6–1	(Turkey) Beşiktaş	2–1	4–0
Maccabi Haifa (Israel)	1–1 (1–3 p)	(Italy) Parma	0–1	1–0 (a.e.t.)

=== First leg ===
20 October 1993
16:00

Benfica (Portugal)	3–1	(Bulgaria) CSKA Sofia
Rui Costa 27', 37'; Schwarz 90'	Report	Andonov 60'

Estádio da Luz, Lisbon
Attendance: 40,000
Referee: Patrick Kelly (Republic of Ireland)

20 October 1993
16:30

Maccabi Haifa (Israel)	0–1	(Italy) Parma
	Report	Brolin 90'

Kiryat Eliezer Stadium, Haifa
Attendance: 3,973
Referee: Gheorghe Constantin (Romania)

20 October 1993
19:00

Paris Saint-Germain (France)	4–0	(Romania) Universitatea Craiova
Guérin 12'; Ginola 17' (pen.); Călin 60' (o.g.); Valdo 72'	Report

Parc des Princes, Paris
Attendance: 11,364
Referee: Leslie Mottram (Scotland)

20 October 1993
19:30

Tirol Innsbruck (Austria)	1–1	(Spain) Real Madrid
Streiter 69' (pen.)	Report	Alfonso 14'

Tivoli, Innsbruck
Attendance: 10,200
Referee: Ryszard Wójcik (Poland)

20 October 1993
19:30

Ajax (Netherlands)	2–1	(Turkey) Beşiktaş
Rijkaard 60'; R. de Boer 81'	Report	Mehmet 40'

Olympic Stadium, Amsterdam
Attendance: 42,000
Referee: Keith Burge (Wales)

20 October 1993
20:00

Arsenal (England)	3–0	(Belgium) Standard Liège
Wright 39', 64'; Merson 51'	Report

Highbury, London
Attendance: 25,258
Referee: Friedrich Kaupe (Austria)

20 October 1993
20:30

Torino (Italy)	3–2	(Scotland) Aberdeen
Sergio 45'; Fortunato 51'; Aguilera 89'	Report	Paatelainen 9'; Jess 24'

Stadio Delle Alpi, Turin
Attendance: 19,410
Referee: Václav Krondl (Czech Republic)

20 October 1993
21:15

Panathinaikos (Greece)	1–4	(Germany) Bayer Leverkusen
Warzycha 44'	Report	Paulo Sérgio 42'; Thom 52'; Kirsten 59'; Hapal 72'

O.A.K.A., Athens
Attendance: 50,318
Referee: Gianni Beschin (Italy)

=== Second leg ===
2 November 1993
20:00

Beşiktaş (Turkey)	0–4	(Netherlands) Ajax
	Report	Litmanen 19', 72', 75'; Pettersson 78'

BJK İnönü Stadium, Istanbul
Attendance: 27,115
Referee: Manuel Díaz Vega (Spain)

Ajax won 6–1 on aggregate.

2 November 1993
20:30

Bayer Leverkusen (Germany)	1–2	(Greece) Panathinaikos
Kirsten 83'	Report	Saravakos 6' (pen.); Georgiadis 66'

Ulrich-Haberland-Stadion, Leverkusen
Attendance: 11,900
Referee: Vadim Zhuk (Belarus)

Bayer Leverkusen won 5–3 on aggregate.

3 November 1993
13:00

Universitatea Craiova (Romania)	0–2	(France) Paris Saint-Germain
	Report	Guérin 29', 48'

Stadionul Central, Craiova
Attendance: 7,848
Referee: John Blankenstein (Netherlands)

Paris Saint-Germain won 6–0 on aggregate.

3 November 1993
17:30

CSKA Sofia (Bulgaria)	1–3	(Portugal) Benfica
Andonov 56'	Report	Rui Costa 31'; João Pinto 73'; Yuran 89'

Vasil Levski National Stadium, Sofia
Attendance: 20,750
Referee: Rune Pedersen (Norway)

Benfica won 6–2 on aggregate.

3 November 1993
19:00

Parma (Italy)	0–1 (a.e.t.)	(Israel) Maccabi Haifa
	Report	Mizrahi 51'
Penalties
Crippa (penalty scored); Minotti (penalty scored); Brolin (penalty scored)	3–1	(penalty missed) Mizrahi; (penalty scored) Glam; (penalty missed) Harazi; (penalty missed) Atar

Stadio Ennio Tardini, Parma
Attendance: 9,312
Referee: Ahmet Çakar (Turkey)

1–1 on aggregate; Parma won 3–1 on penalties.

3 November 1993
19:30

Aberdeen (Scotland)	1–2	(Italy) Torino
Richardson 12'	Report	Fortunato 40'; Silenzi 53'

Pittodrie Stadium, Aberdeen
Attendance: 20,527
Referee: Markus Merk (Germany)

Torino won 5–3 on aggregate.

3 November 1993
20:15

Standard Liège (Belgium)	0–7	(England) Arsenal
	Report	Smith 2'; Selley 20'; Adams 37'; Campbell 41', 79'; Merson 71'; McGoldrick 81'

Stade Maurice Dufrasne, Liège
Attendance: 13,276
Referee: Kaj Natri (Finland)

Arsenal won 10–0 on aggregate.

3 November 1993
21:00

Real Madrid (Spain)	3–0	(Austria) Tirol Innsbruck
Míchel 6'; Butragueño 46'; Alfonso 65'	Report

Santiago Bernabéu Stadium, Madrid
Attendance: 21,600
Referee: Vassilios Nikakis (Greece)

Real Madrid won 4–1 on aggregate.

== Quarter-finals ==
Team 1	Agg.	Team 2	1st leg	2nd leg
Real Madrid (Spain)	1–2	(France) Paris Saint-Germain	0–1	1–1
Torino (Italy)	0–1	(England) Arsenal	0–0	0–1
Benfica (Portugal)	5–5 (a)	(Germany) Bayer Leverkusen	1–1	4–4
Ajax (Netherlands)	0–2	(Italy) Parma	0–0	0–2

=== First leg ===
1 March 1994
21:15

Benfica (Portugal)	1–1	(Germany) Bayer Leverkusen
Isaías 90'	Report	Happe 66'

Estádio da Luz, Lisbon
Attendance: 51,000
Referee: Pierluigi Pairetto (Italy)

2 March 1994
18:30

Torino (Italy)	0–0	(England) Arsenal
	Report

Stadio Delle Alpi, Turin
Attendance: 32,480
Referee: Joël Quiniou (France)

3 March 1994
20:00

Ajax (Netherlands)	0–0	(Italy) Parma
	Report

Olympic Stadium, Amsterdam
Attendance: 39,000
Referee: Philip Don (England)

3 March 1994
21:00

Real Madrid (Spain)	0–1	(France) Paris Saint-Germain
	Report	Weah 32'

Santiago Bernabéu Stadium, Madrid
Attendance: 64,000
Referee: Bernd Heynemann (Germany)

=== Second leg ===
15 March 1994
19:30

Arsenal (England)	1–0	(Italy) Torino
Adams 66'	Report

Highbury, London
Attendance: 34,678
Referee: John Blankenstein (Netherlands)

Arsenal won 1–0 on aggregate.

15 March 1994
20:30

Paris Saint-Germain (France)	1–1	(Spain) Real Madrid
Ricardo Gomes 51'	Report	Butragueño 20'

Parc des Princes, Paris
Attendance: 45,000
Referee: Vadim Zhuk (Belarus)

Paris Saint-Germain won 2–1 on aggregate.

15 March 1994
20:30

Bayer Leverkusen (Germany)	4–4	(Portugal) Benfica
Kirsten 24', 80'; Schuster 57'; Hapal 82'	Report	Abel Xavier 59'; João Pinto 60'; Kulkov 78', 85'

Ulrich-Haberland-Stadion, Leverkusen
Attendance: 18,800
Referee: Jim McCluskey (Scotland)

5–5 on aggregate; Benfica won on away goals.

16 March 1994
17:45

Parma (Italy)	2–0	(Netherlands) Ajax
Minotti 16'; Brolin 49'	Report

Stadio Ennio Tardini, Parma
Attendance: 24,212
Referee: Frans Van Den Wijngaert (Belgium)

Parma won 2–0 on aggregate.

== Semi-finals ==
Team 1	Agg.	Team 2	1st leg	2nd leg
Paris Saint-Germain (France)	1–2	(England) Arsenal	1–1	0–1
Benfica (Portugal)	2–2 (a)	(Italy) Parma	2–1	0–1

=== First leg ===
29 March 1994
20:30

Paris Saint-Germain (France)	1–1	(England) Arsenal
Ginola 50'	Report	Wright 35'

Parc des Princes, Paris
Attendance: 44,000
Referee: Leif Sundell (Sweden)

29 March 1994
21:00

Benfica (Portugal)	2–1	(Italy) Parma
Isaías 11'; Rui Costa 60'	Report	Zola 13'

Estádio da Luz, Lisbon
Attendance: 80,000
Referee: Bernd Heynemann (Germany)

=== Second leg ===
12 April 1994
19:30

Arsenal (England)	1–0	(France) Paris Saint-Germain
Campbell 7'	Report

Highbury, London
Attendance: 34,212
Referee: Peter Mikkelsen (Denmark)

Arsenal won 2–1 on aggregate.

13 April 1994
17:45

Parma (Italy)	1–0	(Portugal) Benfica
Sensini 74'	Report

Stadio Ennio Tardini, Parma
Attendance: 21,488
Referee: Mario van der Ende (Netherlands)

2–2 on aggregate; Parma won on away goals.

== Final ==
4 May 1994
20:15

Arsenal (England)	1–0	(Italy) Parma
Smith 22'	Report

Parken Stadium, Copenhagen
Attendance: 33,765
Referee: Václav Krondl (Czech Republic)

== Top goalscorers ==
The top goalscorers from the 1993–94 European Cup Winners' Cup are as follows:

Rank	Name	Team	Goals
1	(Bulgaria) Ivaylo Andonov	(Bulgaria) CSKA Sofia	5
1	(Scotland) Eoin Jess	(Scotland) Aberdeen	5
1	(Germany) Ulf Kirsten	(Germany) Bayer Leverkusen	5
1	(Israel) Alon Mizrahi	(Israel) Maccabi Haifa	5
5	(Sweden) Tomas Brolin	(Italy) Parma	4
5	(England) Kevin Campbell	(England) Arsenal	4
5	(Romania) Ionel Gane	(Romania) Universitatea Craiova	4
5	(Finland) Jari Litmanen	(Netherlands) Ajax	4
5	(Portugal) Rui Costa	(Portugal) Benfica	4
5	(Bulgaria) Vanyo Shishkov	(Bulgaria) CSKA Sofia	4
5	(England) Ian Wright	(England) Arsenal	4
