= PFC CSKA Sofia in European football =

Bulgarian club in European football

This article lists the results of CSKA Sofia in the European Cup/Champions League, UEFA Cup/Europa League and the UEFA Cup Winners' Cup since they first entered European competition in the 1956–57 season.

== Total statistics ==
Updated 7 August 2026

Competition	S	P	W	D	L	GF	GA	GD
UEFA Champions League / European Cup	25	98	41	16	41	140	144	–4
UEFA Cup Winners' Cup / European Cup Winners' Cup	5	22	12	0	10	49	29	+20
UEFA Europa League / UEFA Cup	26	121	43	36	42	156	143	+13
UEFA Conference League	3	20	5	5	10	18	27	−9
UEFA Intertoto Cup	1	4	2	1	1	8	4	+4
Total	60	265	103	58	104	371	347	+24

== Statistics by country ==
Updated 31 July 2026

Country	Club	P	W	D	L	GF	GA	GD
Albania	Dinamo Tirana	2	2	0	0	5	1	+4
Albania	Partizani Tirana	2	2	0	0	4	0	+4
Albania	KF Tirana	2	2	0	0	4	0	+4
Subtotal		6	6	0	0	13	1	+12
Armenia	Ararat Yerevan	2	1	1	0	3	0	+3
Armenia	Pyunik	2	2	0	0	3	0	+3
Subtotal		4	3	1	0	6	0	+6
Austria	Admira Wacker	2	2	0	0	6	1	+5
Austria	Austria Wien	2	1	0	1	4	5	–1
Austria	Rapid Wien	2	1	0	1	2	3	–1
Austria	Swarovski Tirol	2	1	0	1	2	3	–1
Austria	Wacker Innsbruck	2	2	0	0	4	0	+4
Subtotal		10	7	0	3	18	12	+6
Azerbaijan	Qarabağ	2	0	2	0	0	0	0
Subtotal		2	0	2	0	0	0	0
Belarus	BATE Borisov	1	1	0	0	2	0	+2
Belarus	Belshina Bobruisk	2	1	1	0	3	1	+2
Belarus	Dinamo Minsk	2	2	0	0	5	1	+4
Belarus	Shakhtyor Soligorsk	2	2	0	0	5	2	+3
Subtotal		7	6	1	0	15	4	+11
Belgium	Anderlecht	2	0	1	1	2	4	–2
Subtotal		2	0	1	1	2	4	–2
Croatia	Osijek	4	2	1	1	6	4	+2
Subtotal		4	2	1	1	6	4	+2
Cyprus	Omonia	6	3	2	1	11	8	+3
Subtotal		6	3	2	1	11	8	+3
Czech Republic / Czechoslovakia	Dukla Prague	2	0	1	1	5	6	–1
Czech Republic / Czechoslovakia	Slavia Prague	1	0	0	1	2	4	–2
Czech Republic / Czechoslovakia	Sparta Prague	2	1	1	0	5	2	+3
Czech Republic / Czechoslovakia	Viktoria Plzeň	2	1	0	1	3	2	+1
Subtotal		7	2	2	3	15	14	+1
Denmark	Copenhagen	2	0	0	2	2	4	−2
Subtotal		2	0	0	2	2	4	−2
England	Blackburn Rovers	2	0	2	0	4	4	0
England	Chelsea	2	0	0	2	0	2	–2
England	Fulham	2	0	1	1	1	2	–1
England	Liverpool	6	2	0	4	5	10	–5
England	Newcastle United	2	0	1	1	2	4	–2
England	Nottingham Forest	2	2	0	0	2	0	+2
Subtotal		16	4	4	8	14	22	–8
Faroe Islands	B36 Tórshavn	1	1	0	0	3	1	+3
Subtotal		1	1	0	0	3	1	+3
Finland	Haka	2	2	0	0	11	1	+10
Subtotal		2	2	0	0	11	1	+10
France	Marseille	2	0	0	2	1	4	–3
France	Monaco	5	2	2	1	7	5	+2
France	Saint-Étienne	2	0	1	1	0	1	–1
France	Strasbourg	1	0	1	0	0	0	0
France	Toulouse	2	0	2	0	1	1	0
Subtotal		12	2	6	4	9	11	–2
Germany / West Germany	Bayer Leverkusen	2	2	0	0	2	0	+2
Germany / West Germany	Bayern Munich	8	2	0	6	7	24	–17
Germany / West Germany	Borussia Dortmund	2	1	0	1	4	5	–1
Germany / West Germany	Hamburger SV	5	0	0	5	2	13	–11
Subtotal		17	5	0	12	15	42	–27
Greece	Olympiacos	2	1	0	1	3	2	+1
Greece	Panathinaikos	4	4	0	0	7	1	+6
Subtotal		6	5	0	1	10	3	+7
Hungary	Ferencváros	2	1	0	1	3	5	–2
Hungary	MTK Budapest	2	1	0	1	2	2	0
Hungary	Vasas	2	1	0	1	3	7	–4
Subtotal		6	3	0	3	8	14	–6
Iceland	KA	2	1	0	1	3	1	+2
Subtotal		2	1	0	1	3	1	+2
Italy	Internazionale	3	0	2	1	2	3	–1
Italy	Juventus	6	2	0	4	7	14	–7
Italy	Milan	2	0	0	2	0	3	–3
Italy	Parma	2	0	2	0	1	1	0
Italy	Roma	8	1	1	6	6	16	–10
Subtotal		21	3	5	13	16	37	–21
Latvia	FK Liepāja	2	0	2	0	0	0	0
Latvia	Riga FC	2	1	0	1	1	1	0
Subtotal		4	1	2	1	1	1	0
Liechtenstein	FC Balzers	2	2	0	0	11	1	+10
Subtotal		2	2	0	0	11	1	+10
Malta	Hibernians	1	1	0	0	4	1	+3
Malta	Sirens	1	1	0	0	2	1	+1
Malta	Sliema Wanderers	2	2	0	0	6	1	+5
Subtotal		4	4	0	0	12	3	+9
Moldova	Tiraspol	2	2	0	0	11	2	+9
Moldova	Zimbru Chișinău	2	0	2	0	1	1	0
Subtotal		4	2	2	0	12	3	+9
Montenegro	Titograd	2	1	1	0	4	0	+4
Subtotal		2	1	1	0	4	0	+4
Netherlands	Ajax	4	1	0	3	3	7	–4
Netherlands	Roda JC	2	1	0	1	3	3	0
Subtotal		6	2	0	4	6	10	–4
North Macedonia	Makedonija GP	2	1	1	0	4	0	+4
Subtotal		1	1	1	0	4	0	+4
Northern Ireland	Cliftonville	2	2	0	0	5	1	+4
Northern Ireland	Glentoran	2	1	0	1	3	2	+1
Northern Ireland	Linfield	2	1	1	0	3	2	+1
Northern Ireland	Portadown	2	2	0	0	8	0	+8
Subtotal		8	6	1	1	19	5	+14
Norway	Bodø/Glimt	2	0	1	1	0	2	−2
Norway	Molde	2	1	1	0	2	0	+2
Norway	Viking	1	1	0	0	2	0	+2
Subtotal		5	2	2	1	4	2	+2
Poland	Górnik Zabrze	2	1	0	1	4	3	+1
Poland	Ruch Chorzów	2	1	1	0	6	2	+4
Poland	Szombierki Bytom	2	2	0	0	5	0	+5
Subtotal		6	4	1	1	15	5	+10
Portugal	Benfica	4	0	1	3	3	8	–5
Portugal	Porto	2	0	0	2	1	4	–3
Portugal	Sporting CP	2	0	2	0	2	2	0
Subtotal		8	0	3	5	6	14	–8
Republic of Ireland	Derry City	4	3	1	0	7	4	+3
Republic of Ireland	Limerick	2	2	0	0	4	1	+3
Republic of Ireland	St Patrick's Athletic	2	1	0	1	2	1	+1
Subtotal		8	6	1	1	13	6	+7
Romania	CFR Cluj	2	0	1	1	0	2	–2
Romania	Dinamo București	2	1	0	1	10	4	+6
Romania	Steaua București	6	0	3	3	7	12	–5
Romania	Sepsi OSK	2	0	0	2	0	6	–6
Subtotal		12	1	4	7	17	24	–7
Russia	Dynamo Moscow	2	1	1	0	2	1	+1
Russia	Torpedo Moscow	2	0	2	0	2	2	0
Russia	Ural Sverdlovsk Oblast	1	0	0	1	1	2	–1
Subtotal		5	1	3	1	5	5	0
Serbia / Serbia and Montenegro / (Socialist Federal Republic of Yugoslavia) Yugoslavia	Hajduk Kula	2	0	2	0	1	1	0
Serbia / Serbia and Montenegro / (Socialist Federal Republic of Yugoslavia) Yugoslavia	Partizan	2	2	0	0	6	2	+4
Serbia / Serbia and Montenegro / (Socialist Federal Republic of Yugoslavia) Yugoslavia	Red Star Belgrade	2	1	0	1	3	4	–1
Subtotal		6	3	2	1	10	7	+3
Slovakia / Czechoslovakia	Inter Bratislava	2	2	0	0	8	2	+6
Subtotal		2	2	0	0	8	2	+6
Slovenia	Mura 05	2	0	2	0	1	1	0
Subtotal		2	0	2	0	1	1	± 0
Spain	Atlético Madrid	5	1	0	4	5	10	–5
Spain	Barcelona	4	0	1	3	7	14	–7
Spain	Real Sociedad	2	1	1	0	1	0	+1
Spain	Valencia	2	1	0	1	3	5	–2
Subtotal		13	3	2	8	16	29	–13
Sweden	IFK Malmö	2	0	1	1	1	2	–1
Subtotal		2	0	1	1	1	2	–1
Switzerland	Basel	5	2	0	3	5	8	–3
Switzerland	Servette	2	1	0	1	2	2	0
Switzerland	Young Boys	2	0	0	2	0	4	−4
Switzerland	Zürich	2	0	1	1	1	2	–1
Subtotal		11	3	1	7	8	16	–8
Turkey	Beşiktaş	4	0	1	3	3	7	–4
Turkey	Galatasaray	2	0	0	2	0	6	–6
Turkey	Kocaelispor	1	1	0	0	3	1	+2
Subtotal		7	1	1	5	6	14	–8
Ukraine / Soviet Union	Dynamo Kyiv	4	0	1	3	2	5	–3
Ukraine / Soviet Union	Shakhtar Donetsk	2	1	0	1	4	2	+2
Ukraine / Soviet Union	Zorya Luhansk	4	0	1	3	1	5	−4
Subtotal		10	1	2	7	7	12	–5
Wales	The New Saints	2	1	1	0	5	2	+3
Subtotal		2	1	1	0	5	2	+3
Total		262	102	56	104	368	347	+21

== Statistics by competition ==
=== UEFA Champions League / European Cup ===
Season	Round	Club	Home	Away	Neutral	Aggregate
1956–57	First round	(Romania) Dinamo București	8–1	2–3		10–4
1956–57	Quarter-finals	(Socialist Federal Republic of Yugoslavia) Red Star Belgrade	2–1	1–3		3–4
1957–58	Preliminary round	(Hungary) Vasas	2–1	1–6		3–7
1958–59	First round	(Spain) Atlético Madrid	1–0	1–2	1–3	3–5
1959–60	Preliminary round	(Spain) Barcelona	2–2	2–6		4–8
1960–61	Preliminary round	(Italy) Juventus	4–1	0–2		4–3
1960–61	First round	(Sweden) IFK Malmö	1–1	0–1		1–2
1961–62	Preliminary round	(Czechoslovakia) Dukla Prague	4–4	1–2		5–6
1962–63	Preliminary round	(Socialist Federal Republic of Yugoslavia) Partizan	2–1	4–1		6–2
1962–63	First round	(Belgium) Anderlecht	2–2	0–2		2–4
1966–67	Preliminary round	(Malta) Sliema Wanderers	4–0	2–1		6–1
1966–67	First round	(Greece) Olympiacos	3–1	0–1		3–2
1966–67	Second round	(Poland) Górnik Zabrze	4–0	0–3		4–3
1966–67	Quarter-finals	(Northern Ireland) Linfield	1–0	2–2		3–2
1966–67	Semi-finals	(Italy) Internazionale	1–1	1–1	0–1	2–3
1969–70	First round	(Hungary) Ferencváros	2–1	1–4		3–5
1971–72	First round	(Albania) Partizani Tirana	3–0	1–0		4–0
1971–72	Second round	(Portugal) Benfica	0–0	1–2		1–2
1972–73	First round	(Greece) Panathinaikos	2–1	2–0		4–1
1972–73	Second round	(Netherlands) Ajax	1–3	0–3		1–6
1973–74	First round	(Austria) Wacker	3–0	1–0		4–0
1973–74	Second round	(Netherlands) Ajax	2–0	0–1		2–1
1973–74	Quarter-finals	(West Germany) Bayern Munich	2–1	1–4		3–5
1975–76	First round	(Italy) Juventus	2–1	0–2		2–3
1976–77	First round	(France) Saint-Étienne	0–0	0–1		0–1
1980–81	First round	(England) Nottingham Forest	1–0	1–0		2–0
1980–81	Second round	(Poland) Szombierki Bytom	4–0	1–0		5–0
1980–81	Quarter-finals	(England) Liverpool	0–1	1–5		1–6
1981–82	First round	(Spain) Real Sociedad	1–0	0–0		1–0
1981–82	Second round	(Northern Ireland) Glentoran	2–0	1–2		3–2
1981–82	Quarter-finals	(England) Liverpool	2–0	0–1		2–1
1981–82	Semi-finals	(West Germany) Bayern Munich	4–3	0–4		4–7
1982–83	First round	(France) Monaco	2–0	0–0		2–0
1982–83	Second round	(Portugal) Sporting CP	2–2	0–0		2–2 (a)
1983–84	First round	(Cyprus) Omonia	3–0	1–4		4–4 (a)
1983–84	Second round	(Italy) Roma	0–1	0–1		0–2
1987–88	First round	(West Germany) Bayern Munich	0–1	0–4		0–5
1989–90	First round	(Poland) Ruch Chorzów	5–1	1–1		6–2
1989–90	Second round	(Czechoslovakia) Sparta Prague	3–0	2–2		5–2
1989–90	Quarter-finals	(France) Marseille	0–1	1–3		1–4
1990–91	First round	(Iceland) KA Akureyri	3–0	0–1		3–1
1990–91	Second round	(West Germany) Bayern Munich	0–3	0–4		0–7
1992–93	First round	Austria Wien	3–2	1–3		4–5
1997–98	First qualifying round	(Romania) Steaua București	0–2	3–3		3–5
2003–04	Second qualifying round	(Armenia) Pyunik	1–0	2–0		3–0
2003–04	Third qualifying round	(Turkey) Galatasaray	0–3	0–3		0–6
2005–06	Second qualifying round	(Albania) KF Tirana	2–0	2–0		4–0
2005–06	Third qualifying round	(England) Liverpool	1–3	1–0		2–3

=== UEFA Cup Winners' Cup / European Cup Winners' Cup ===
Season	Round	Club	Home	Away	Aggregate
1965–66	First round	(Republic of Ireland) Limerick	2–0	2–1	4–1
1965–66	Second round	(West Germany) Borussia Dortmund	4–2	0–3	4–5
1970–71	First round	(Finland) Haka	9–0	2–1	11–1
1970–71	Second round	(England) Chelsea	0–1	0–1	0–2
1974–75	First round	(Soviet Union) Dynamo Kyiv	0–1	0–1	0–2
1988–89	First round	(Czechoslovakia) Internacional Bratislava	5–0	3–2	8–2
1988–89	Second round	(Greece) Panathinaikos	2–0	1–0	3–0
1988–89	Quarter-finals	(Netherlands) Roda JC	2–1	1–2 (a.e.t.)	3–3 (4–3 p)
1988–89	Semi-finals	(Spain) Barcelona	1–2	2–4	3–6
1993–94	First round	(Liechtenstein) Balzers	8–0	3–1	11–1
1993–94	Second round	(Portugal) Benfica	1–3	1–3	2–6

=== UEFA Europa League / UEFA Cup ===
Season	Round	Club	Home	Away	Aggregate
1977–78	First round	(Switzerland) Zürich	1–1 (a.e.t.)	0–1	1–2
1978–79	First round	(Spain) Valencia	2–1	1–4	3–5
1979–80	First round	(Soviet Union) Dynamo Kyiv	1–1	1–2	2–3
1984–85	First round	(France) Monaco	2–1	2–2	4–3
1984–85	Second round	(West Germany) Hamburger SV	1–2	0–4	1–6
1986–87	First round	(Austria) Swarovski Tirol	2–0	0–3	2–3
1991–92	First round	(Italy) Parma	0–0	1–1	1–1 (a)
1991–92	Second round	(Germany) Hamburger SV	1–4	0–2	1–6
1994–95	Preliminary round	(Armenia) Ararat Yerevan	3–0	0–0	3–0
1994–95	First round	(Italy) Juventus	3–2	1–5	4–7
1998–99	First qualifying round	(Belarus) Belshina Bobruisk	3–1	0–0	3–1
1998–99	Second qualifying round	(Norway) Molde	2–0	0–0	2–0
1998–99	First round	(Switzerland) Servette	1–0	1–2	2–2 (a)
1998–99	Second round	(Spain) Atlético Madrid	2–4	0–1	2–5
1999–2000	Qualifying round	(Northern Ireland) Portadown	5–0	3–0	8–0
1999–2000	First round	(England) Newcastle United	0–2	2–2	2–4
2000–01	Qualifying round	(Moldova) Constructorul Chișinău	8–0	3–2	11–2
2000–01	First round	(Hungary) MTK Hungária	1–2	1–0	2–2 (a)
2001–02	Qualifying round	(Belarus) Shakhtyor Soligorsk	3–1	2–1	5–2
2001–02	First round	(Ukraine) Shakhtar Donetsk	3–0	1–2	4–2
2001–02	Second round	(Italy) Milan	0–1	0–2	0–3
2002–03	Qualifying round	(Belarus) Dinamo Minsk	1–0	4–1	5–1
2002–03	First round	(England) Blackburn Rovers	3–3	1–1	4–4 (a)
2003–04	First round	(Russia) Torpedo Moscow	1–1	1–1 (a.e.t.)	2–2 (2–3 p)
2004–05	Second qualifying round	(Cyprus) Omonia	3–1 (a.e.t.)	1–1	4–2
2004–05	First round	(Romania) Steaua București	2–2	1–2	3–4
2005–06	First round	(Germany) Bayer Leverkusen	1–0	1–0	2–0
2005–06	Group stage (A)	(Germany) Hamburger SV	0–1		5th place
2005–06	Group stage (A)	(Czech Republic) Slavia Prague		2–4	5th place
2005–06	Group stage (A)	(Norway) Viking	2–0		5th place
2005–06	Group stage (A)	(France) Monaco		1–2	5th place
2006–07	First qualifying round	(Albania) Dinamo Tirana	4–1	1–0	5–1
2006–07	Second qualifying round	(Serbia and Montenegro) Hajduk Kula	0–0	1–1	1–1 (a)
2006–07	First round	(Turkey) Beşiktaş	2–2 (a.e.t.)	0–2	2–4
2007–08	Second qualifying round	(Cyprus) Omonia	2–1	1–1	3–2
2007–08	First round	(France) Toulouse	1–1	0–0	1–1 (a)
2009–10	Third qualifying round	(Republic of Ireland) Derry City	1–0	1–1	2–1
2009–10	Play-off round	(Russia) Dynamo Moscow	0–0	2–1	2–1
2009–10	Group stage (E)	(England) Fulham	1–1	0–1	4th place
2009–10	Group stage (E)	(Italy) Roma	0–3	0–2	4th place
2009–10	Group stage (E)	(Switzerland) Basel	0–2	1–3	4th place
2010–11	Third qualifying round	(Northern Ireland) Cliftonville	3–0	2–1	5–1
2010–11	Play-off round	(Wales) The New Saints	3–0	2–2	5–2
2010–11	Group stage (L)	(Turkey) Beşiktaş	1–2	0–1	4th place
2010–11	Group stage (L)	(Portugal) Porto	0–1	1–3	4th place
2010–11	Group stage (L)	(Austria) Rapid Wien	0–2	2–1	4th place
2011–12	Play-off round	(Romania) Steaua București	1–1	0–2	1–3
2012–13	Second qualifying round	(Slovenia) Mura 05	1–1	0–0	1–1 (a)
2014–15	Second qualifying round	(Moldova) Zimbru Chișinău	1–1	0–0	1–1 (a)
2018–19	First qualifying round	(Latvia) Riga FC	1–0	0–1 (a.e.t.)	1–1 (5–3 p)
2018–19	Second qualifying round	(Austria) Admira Wacker	3−0	3−1	6−1
2018–19	Third qualifying round	(Denmark) Copenhagen	1−2	1−2	2−4
2019–20	First qualifying round	(Montenegro) Titograd	4−0	0−0	4−0
2019–20	Second qualifying round	(Croatia) Osijek	1−0	0–1 (a.e.t.)	1–1 (4–3 p)
2019–20	Third qualifying round	(Ukraine) Zorya Luhansk	1−1	0−1	1–2
2020–21	First qualifying round	(Malta) Sirens	2−1	—N/a	—N/a
2020–21	Second qualifying round	(Belarus) BATE Borisov	2−0	—N/a	—N/a
2020–21	Third qualifying round	(Faroe Islands) B36 Tórshavn	3−1	—N/a	—N/a
2020–21	Play-off round	(Switzerland) Basel	—N/a	3−1	—N/a
2020–21	Group stage (A)	(Romania) CFR Cluj	0−2	0−0	4th place
2020–21	Group stage (A)	(Italy) Roma	3−1	0−0	4th place
2020–21	Group stage (A)	(Switzerland) Young Boys	0−1	0−3	4th place
2026–27	First qualifying round	(Republic of Ireland) Derry City	3−2	2−1	5−3
2026–27	Second qualifying round	(Azerbaijan) Qarabağ	0−0 (a.e.t.)	0−0	0−0 (5−4 p)
2026–27	Third qualifying round	(Israel) Maccabi Tel Aviv	1−3	3−0	4−3
2026–27	Play-off round	(Greece) OFI Crete	0–2	0–3	0–5

=== UEFA Europa Conference League ===
Season	Round	Club	Home	Away	Aggregate
2021–22	Second qualifying round	(Latvia) Liepāja	0−0	0−0 (a.e.t.)	0−0 (3−1 p)
2021–22	Third qualifying round	(Croatia) Osijek	4−2	1−1	5−3
2021–22	Play-off round	(Czech Republic) Viktoria Plzeň	3−0 (a.e.t.)	0−2	3−2
2021–22	Group stage (C)	(Italy) Roma	2−3	1−5	4th place
2021–22	Group stage (C)	(Norway) Bodø/Glimt	0−0	0−2	4th place
2021–22	Group stage (C)	(Ukraine) Zorya Luhansk	0−1	0−2	4th place
2022–23	Second qualifying round	(North Macedonia) Makedonija GP	4−0	0−0	4−0
2022–23	Third qualifying round	(Republic of Ireland) St Patrick's Athletic	0−1	2−0	2−1
2022–23	Play-off round	(Switzerland) Basel	1−0	0−2	1–2
2023–24	Second qualifying round	(Romania) Sepsi OSK	0−2	0−4	0−6
2026–27	League stage	(France) Monaco		—N/a	
2026–27	League stage	(Denmark) Nordsjælland	—N/a		
2026–27	League stage	(Greece) Panathinaikos		—N/a	
2026–27	League stage	(Turkey) Trabzonspor	—N/a		
2026–27	League stage	(Finland) KuPS	—N/a		
2026–27	League stage	(Switzerland) Thun		—N/a	

=== UEFA Intertoto Cup ===
Season	Round	Club	Home	Away	Aggregate
1996	Group stage (11)	(Turkey) Kocaelispor		3–1	2nd place
1996	Group stage (11)	(Malta) Hibernians	4–1		2nd place
1996	Group stage (11)	(Russia) Uralmash		1–2	2nd place
1996	Group stage (11)	(France) Strasbourg	0–0		2nd place

== 1956–57 European Cup ==
=== First round ===
21 October 1956
20:00

CDNA Sofia (Bulgaria)	8–1	(Romania) Dinamo București
Kolev 12', 27', 56', 64'; Milanov 21', 67'; Panayotov 65'; Dimitrov 80'	Report	Băcuț 71' (pen.)

Vasil Levski National Stadium, Sofia
Attendance: 50,000
Referee: Vasa Stefanović (Yugoslavia)
30 December 1956
14:00

Dinamo București (Romania)	3–2	(Bulgaria) CDNA Sofia
Nicolae 58' (pen.); Lăzar 67'; Neagu 84'	Report	Stoyanov 22'; Yanev 62'

Stadionul Republicii, Bucharest
Attendance: 20,000
Referee: Gustav Jiranek (Austria)

CDNA Sofia won 10–4 on aggregate.

=== Quarter-finals ===
17 February 1957
14:30

Red Star Belgrade (Socialist Federal Republic of Yugoslavia)	3–1	(Bulgaria) CDNA Sofia
Kostić 7', 25'; Popović 53'	Report	Yanev 89'

JNA Stadion, Belgrade
Attendance: 33,000
Referee: Riccardo Pieri (Italy)
24 February 1957
14:00

CDNA Sofia (Bulgaria)	2–1	(Socialist Federal Republic of Yugoslavia) Red Star Belgrade
Bozhkov 22' (pen.); Panayotov 39'	Report	Tasić 29' (pen.)

Vasil Levski National Stadium, Sofia
Attendance: 50,000
Referee: Nikolai Latyshev (Soviet Union)

Red Star Belgrade won 4–3 on aggregate.

== 1957–58 European Cup ==
=== First round ===
4 September 1957
21:00

CDNA Sofia (Bulgaria)	2–1	(Hungary) Vasas
Milanov 2', 38'	Report	Bundzsák 53'

Vasil Levski National Stadium, Sofia
Attendance: 50,000
Referee: Erich Steiner (Austria)
3 October 1957
21:00

Vasas (Hungary)	6–1	(Bulgaria) CDNA Sofia
Csordás 35', 38', 51'; Berendy 48'; Bundzsák 68'; Szilágyi 89'	Report	Panayotov 25'

Népstadion, Budapest
Attendance: 30,000
Referee: Alfred Grill (Austria)

Vasas won 7–3 on aggregate.

== 1958–59 European Cup ==
=== Second round ===
5 November 1958
21:15

Atlético Madrid (Spain)	2–1	(Bulgaria) CDNA Sofia
Vavá 60'; Peiró 79'	Report	Dimitrov 77'

Santiago Bernabéu Stadium, Madrid
Attendance: 80,000
Referee: Paul Wyssling (Switzerland)
26 November 1958
19:30

CDNA Sofia (Bulgaria)	1–0	(Spain) Atlético Madrid
Panayotov 64'	Report

Vasil Levski National Stadium, Sofia
Attendance: 50,000
Referee: Paul Wyssling (Switzerland)

2–2 on aggregate.

18 December 1958
21:30

Atlético Madrid (Spain)	3–1 (a.e.t.)	(Bulgaria) CDNA Sofia
Vavá 42', 108' (pen.); Callejo 99'	Report	Yanev 17'

Stade des Charmilles, Geneva
Attendance: 30,000
Referee: Daniel Mellet (Switzerland)

Atlético Madrid won 3–1 in the playoff.

== 1959–60 European Cup ==
=== First round ===
1959-09-03

CDNA Sofia (Bulgaria)	2–2	(Spain) Barcelona
Rakarov 16'; Kolev 80'		Segarra 30'; Martínez 61'

Vasil Levski, Sofia
Attendance: 55,000
Referee: John Clough (England)
1959-09-23

Barcelona (Spain)	6–2	(Bulgaria) CDNA Sofia
Kubala 6' 14' (pen.), 45' (pen.); Evaristo 39', 68', 78'		Milanov 24'; Martinov 57'

Camp Nou, Barcelona
Attendance: 80,000
Referee: Arthur Edward Ellis (England)

Barcelona won 8–4 on aggregate.

== 1960–61 European Cup ==
=== Preliminary round ===
21 September 1960

Juventus (Italy)	2–0	(Bulgaria) CDNA Sofia
Lojodice 5'; Sívori 24'

Turin
12 October 1960

CDNA Sofia (Bulgaria)	4–1	(Italy) Juventus
Rakarov 19'; Kovachev 56'; Panayotov 68'; Tsanev 75'		Nicolè 88'

Sofia

CDNA Sofia won 4–3 on aggregate.

=== First round ===
2 November 1960

IFK Malmö (Sweden)	1–0	(Bulgaria) CDNA Sofia
Karlsson 80'

Malmö Stadion, Malmö
Attendance: 7,707
Referee: Josef Kandlbinder (Germany)
13 November 1960

CDNA Sofia (Bulgaria)	1–1	(Sweden) IFK Malmö
Tsanev 21'		Olofsson 52'

Vasil Levski National Stadium, Sofia
Attendance: 52,000
Referee: Johannes Malka (Germany)

IFK Malmö won 2–1 on aggregate.

== 1961–62 European Cup ==
=== First round ===
6 September 1961

CDNA Sofia (Bulgaria)	4–4	(Czech Republic) Dukla Prague
Rankov 32'; Rakarov 49'; Romanov 64', 86'		Jelinek 35'; Kučera 42'; Dvořák 53'; Adamec 61'

Bulgarian Army Stadium, Sofia
13 September 1961

Dukla Prague (Czech Republic)	2–1	(Bulgaria) CDNA Sofia
Kučera 54'; Šafránek 70'		Rankov 44'

Stadion Juliska, Prague

Dukla Prague won 6–5 on aggregate.

== 1962–63 European Cup ==
=== Preliminary round ===
19 September 1962

CSKA Red Flag (Bulgaria)	2–1	(Socialist Federal Republic of Yugoslavia) Partizan
Rankov 14'; Kolev 19'		Kovačević 35' (pen.)

Balgarska Armiya Stadium, Sofia
3 October 1962

Partizan (Socialist Federal Republic of Yugoslavia)	1–4	(Bulgaria) CSKA Red Flag
Galić 70'		Tsanev 23'; Yakimov 48'; Kovachev 80' (pen.); Panayotov 90'

JNA Stadium, Belgrade

CSKA Red Flag won 6–2 on aggregate.

=== First round ===
24 October 1962

CSKA Red Flag (Bulgaria)	2–2	(Belgium) Anderlecht
Kolev 57'; Yakimov 85'		Jurion 62', 76'

Vasil Levski National Stadium, Sofia
14 November 1962

Anderlecht (Belgium)	2–0	(Bulgaria) CSKA Red Flag
Lippens 40' (pen.), 51' (pen.)

Émile Versé Stadium, Anderlecht

Anderlecht won 4–2 on aggregate.

== 1965–66 European Cup Winners' Cup ==
=== First round ===
7 October 1965

Limerick (Republic of Ireland)	1–2	(Bulgaria) CSKA Cherveno Zname
Mitchell 14'		Tsanev 11'; Kamenov 22'

Jackman Park, Limerick
13 October 1965

CSKA Cherveno Zname (Bulgaria)	2–0	(Republic of Ireland) Limerick
Kolev 53'; Kamenov 71'

Bulgarian Army Stadium, Sofia

CSKA Cherveno Zname won 4–1 on aggregate.

=== Second round ===
10 November 1965

Borussia Dortmund (Germany)	3–0	(Bulgaria) CSKA Cherveno Zname
Sturm 17'; Held 35'; Schmidt 54'

Stadion Rote Erde, Dortmund
24 November 1965

CSKA Cherveno Zname (Bulgaria)	4–2	(Germany) Borussia Dortmund
Romanov 7', 43', 68'; Vasilev 75' (pen.)		Held 24'; Emmerich 40'

Vasil Levski National Stadium, Sofia

Borussia Dortmund won 5–4 on aggregate.

== 1966–67 European Cup ==
=== Preliminary round ===
7 September 1966

Sliema Wanderers (Malta)	1–2	(Bulgaria) CSKA Cherveno Zname
Quini 57'		Yakimov 20', 54' (pen.)

Ta' Qali National Stadium, Ta' Qali
14 September 1966

CSKA Cherveno Zname (Bulgaria)	4–0	(Malta) Sliema Wanderers
Zafirov 39'; Yakimov 42' (pen.); Nikodimov 54'; Tsanev 77'

Bulgarian Army Stadium, Sofia

CSKA Cherveno Zname won 6–1 on aggregate.

=== First round ===
28 September 1966

CSKA Cherveno Zname (Bulgaria)	3–1	(Greece) Olympiacos
Penev 64'; Vasilev 71'; Tsanev 90'		Papatsoglou 31'

Vasil Levski National Stadium, Sofia
5 October 1966

Olympiacos (Greece)	1–0	(Bulgaria) CSKA Cherveno Zname
Sideris 64'

Karaiskakis Stadium, Piraeus

CSKA Cherveno Zname won 3–2 on aggregate.

=== Second round ===
23 November 1966

CSKA Cherveno Zname (Bulgaria)	4–0	(Poland) Górnik Zabrze
Marashliev 31', 44'; Tsanev 71' (pen.); Vasilev 89'

Vasil Levski National Stadium, Sofia
7 December 1966

Górnik Zabrze (Poland)	3–0	(Bulgaria) CSKA Cherveno Zname
Szołtysik 1'; Pohl 26', 44'

Górnik Zabrze Stadium, Zabrze

CSKA Cherveno Zname won 4–3 on aggregate.

=== Quarter-finals ===
1 March 1967

Linfield (Northern Ireland)	2–2	(Bulgaria) CSKA Cherveno Zname
Hamilton 40'; Shields 43'		Romanov 2', 63'

Windsor Park, Belfast
15 March 1967

CSKA Cherveno Zname (Bulgaria)	1–0	(Northern Ireland) Linfield
Yakimov 54'

Vasil Levski National Stadium, Sofia

CSKA Cherveno Zname won 3–2 on aggregate.

=== Semi-finals ===
19 April 1967

Internazionale (Italy)	1–1	(Bulgaria) CSKA Cherveno Zname
Facchetti 44'		Tsanev 65'

Milan
26 April 1967

CSKA Cherveno Zname (Bulgaria)	1–1	(Italy) Internazionale
Radlev 77'		Facchetti 62'

Vasil Levski, Sofia
Attendance: 70,000

2–2 on aggregate.

3 May 1967

Internazionale (Italy)	1–0	(Bulgaria) CSKA Cherveno Zname
Cappellini 12'

Bologna

Internazionale won 1–0 in the play-off.

== 1969–70 European Cup ==
=== First round ===
17 September 1969

CSKA Septemvriysko Zname (Bulgaria)	2–1	(Hungary) Ferencváros
Zhekov 9', 53'

Vasil Levski National Stadium, Sofia
1 October 1969

Ferencváros (Hungary)	4–1	(Bulgaria) CSKA Septemvriysko Zname
Szőke 3', 83' (pen.); Branikovics 16'; Rákosi 60'		Zhekov 27'

Népstadion, Budapest

Ferencváros won 5–3 on aggregate.

== 1970–71 European Cup Winners' Cup ==
=== First round ===
16 September 1970

CSKA Sofia (Bulgaria)	9–0	(Finland) Haka
Yakimov 7', 30', 64'; Nikodimov 15' (pen.), 37'; Zhekov 61', 81'; Marashliev 77'

Bulgarian Army Stadium, Sofia
30 September 1970

Haka (Finland)	1–2	(Bulgaria) CSKA Sofia
Malm 88'		Yakimov 50', 56'

Tehtaan kenttä, Valkeakoski

CSKA Sofia won 11–1 on aggregate.

=== Second round ===
21 October 1970

CSKA Sofia (Bulgaria)	0–1	(England) Chelsea
		Baldwin 43'

Vasil Levski National Stadium, Sofia
4 November 1970

Chelsea (England)	1–0	(Bulgaria) CSKA Sofia
Webb 41'

Stamford Bridge, London

Chelsea won 2–0 on aggregate.

== 1971–72 European Cup ==
=== First round ===
15 September 1971

CSKA Sofia (Bulgaria)	3–0	(Albania) Partizani Tirana
Atanasov 20'; Nikodimov 44' (pen.); Marashliev 65'

Bulgarian Army Stadium, Sofia
29 September 1971

Partizani Tirana (Albania)	0–1	(Bulgaria) CSKA Sofia
		Atanasov 57'

Qemal Stafa Stadium, Tirana

CSKA Sofia won 4–0 on aggregate.

=== Second round ===
20 October 1971

Benfica (Portugal)	2–1	(Bulgaria) CSKA Sofia
Rodrigues 51'; Jorge 63'		Zhekov 85'

Lisbon
3 November 1971

CSKA Sofia (Bulgaria)	0–0	(Portugal) Benfica

Sofia

Benfica won 2–1 on aggregate.

== 1972–73 European Cup ==
=== First round ===
13 September 1972

CSKA Sofia (Bulgaria)	2–1	(Greece) Panathinaikos
Kolev 24' (pen.); Yankov 71'		Verón 59'

Sofia
27 September 1972

Panathinaikos (Greece)	2–1	(Bulgaria) CSKA Sofia
Verón 18'; Demelo 20' (pen.)		Trankov 68'
Penalties
	2–3

Athens

The game was annulled due to errors in the penalty shootout procedures;

26 October 1972

Panathinaikos (Greece)	0–2	(Bulgaria) CSKA Sofia
		Zhekov 4'; Kolev 46'

Athens

CSKA Sofia won 4–1 on aggregate.

=== Second round ===
8 November 1972

CSKA Sofia (Bulgaria)	1–3	(Netherlands) Ajax
Zhekov 27'		Swart 13'; Keizer 32'; Haan 52'

Sofia
29 November 1972

Ajax (Netherlands)	3–0	(Bulgaria) CSKA Sofia
Cruyff 13', 75'; Blakenburg 15'

Amsterdam

Ajax won 6–1 on aggregate.

== 1973–74 European Cup ==
=== First round ===
19 September 1973

CSKA September Flag (Bulgaria)	3–0	(Austria) Wacker Innsbruck
Marashliev 3'; Zhekov 26'; Denev 38'

Sofia
3 October 1973

Wacker Innsbruck (Austria)	0–1	(Bulgaria) CSKA September Flag
		Zhekov 18'

Innsbruck

CSKA September Flag won 4–0 on aggregate.

=== Second round ===
24 October 1973

Ajax (Netherlands)	1–0	(Bulgaria) CSKA Sofia
Keizer 14'

Amsterdam
7 November 1973

CSKA Sofia (Bulgaria)	2–0 (a.e.t.)	(Netherlands) Ajax
Marashliev 68'; Mihaylov 116'

Sofia

CSKA Sofia won 2–1 on aggregate.

=== Quarter finals ===
5 March 1974

Bayern Munich (West Germany)	4–1	(Bulgaria) CSKA Sofia
Torstensson 11', 88'; Beckenbauer 33'; Müller 65'		Marashliev 23'

Munich
20 March 1974

CSKA Sofia (Bulgaria)	2–1	(West Germany) Bayern Munich
Kolev 41' (pen.); Denev 48'		Breitner 30' (pen.)

Sofia

Bayern Munich won 5–3 on aggregate.

== 1974–75 European Cup Winners' Cup ==
=== First round ===
18 September 1974

Dynamo Kyiv (Soviet Union)	1–0	(Bulgaria) CSKA Sofia
Blokhin 57'

Kiev
2 October 1974

CSKA Sofia (Bulgaria)	0–1	(Soviet Union) Dynamo Kyiv
		Blokhin 81'

Sofia

Dynamo Kyiv won 2–0 on aggregate.

== 1975–76 European Cup ==
=== First round ===
17 September 1975

CSKA Sofia (Bulgaria)	2–1	(Italy) Juventus
Denev 80'; Marashliev 89'		Anastasi 39'

Sofia
1 October 1975

Juventus (Italy)	2–0	(Bulgaria) CSKA Sofia
Anastasi 39'; Furino 51'

Turin

Juventus won 3–2 on aggregate.

== 1976–77 European Cup ==
=== First round ===
15 September 1976

CSKA September Flag (Bulgaria)	0–0	(France) Saint-Étienne

Sofia
29 September 1976

Saint-Étienne (France)	1–0	(Bulgaria) CSKA September Flag
Piazza 31'

Saint-Étienne

Saint-Étienne won 1–0 on aggregate.

== 1977–78 UEFA Cup ==
=== First round ===
14 September 1977

Zürich (Switzerland)	1–0	(Bulgaria) CSKA Sofia
Rizzi 4'

Zürich
28 September 1977

CSKA Sofia (Bulgaria)	1–1 (a.e.t.)	(Switzerland) Zürich
Markov 32'		Qucinotta 104'

Sofia

Zürich won 2–1 on aggregate.

== 1978–79 UEFA Cup ==
=== First round ===
13 September 1978

CSKA Sofia (Bulgaria)	2–1	(Spain) Valencia
Dzhevizov 7'; Hristov 54'		Solsona 71'

Sofia
27 September 1978

Valencia (Spain)	4–1	(Bulgaria) CSKA Sofia
Saura 16', 82'; Felman 53'; Kempes 87'		Hristov 17'

Valencia

Valencia won 5–3 on aggregate.

== 1979–80 UEFA Cup ==
=== First round ===
19 September 1979

Dynamo Kyiv (Soviet Union)	2–1	(Bulgaria) CSKA Sofia
Bezsonov 2'; Demyanenko 55'		Metodiev 34'

Kiev
3 October 1979

CSKA Sofia (Bulgaria)	1–1	(Soviet Union) Dynamo Kyiv
Metodiev 63' (pen.)		Buryak 61'

Sofia

Dynamo Kyiv won 3–2 on aggregate.

== 1980–81 European Cup ==
=== First round ===
17 September 1980

CSKA Sofia (Bulgaria)	1–0	(England) Nottingham Forest
Yonchev 70'

Sofia
1 October 1980

Nottingham Forest (England)	0–1	(Bulgaria) CSKA Sofia
		Kerimov 33'

Nottingham

CSKA Sofia won 2–0 on aggregate.

=== Second round ===
22 October 1980

CSKA Sofia (Bulgaria)	4–0	(Poland) Szombierki Bytom
Yonchev 22', 58', 60'; Zdravkov 75'

Sofia
5 November 1980

Szombierki Bytom (Poland)	0–1	(Bulgaria) CSKA Sofia
		Dzhevizov 53'

Bytom

CSKA Sofia won 5–0 on aggregate.

=== Quarter finals ===
4 March 1981

Liverpool (England)	5–1	(Bulgaria) CSKA Sofia
Souness 16' 51' 80'; Lee 45'; McDermott 62'	Report	Yonchev 60'

Anfield, Liverpool
Attendance: 37,255
18 March 1981

CSKA Sofia (Bulgaria)	0–1	(England) Liverpool
	Report	Johnson 10'

Vassil Levski, Sofia
Attendance: 60,000

Liverpool won 6–1 on aggregate.

== 1981–82 European Cup ==
=== First round ===
16 September 1981

CSKA September Flag (Bulgaria)	1–0	(Spain) Real Sociedad
Yonchev 89'

Sofia
30 September 1981

Real Sociedad (Spain)	0–0	(Bulgaria) CSKA September Flag

San Sebastián

CSKA September Flag won 1–0 on aggregate.

=== Second round ===
21 October 1981

CSKA September Flag (Bulgaria)	2–0	(Northern Ireland) Glentoran
Dimitrov 8'; Zdravkov 35' (pen.)

Sofia
4 November 1981

Glentoran (Northern Ireland)	2–1 (a.e.t.)	(Bulgaria) CSKA September Flag
Cleary 67'; Manley 71'		Dimitrov 115'

Belfast

CSKA September Flag won 3–2 on aggregate.

=== Quarter finals ===
3 March 1982

Liverpool (England)	1–0	(Bulgaria) CSKA September Flag
Whelan 65'	Report

Anfield, Liverpool
Attendance: 27,388
17 March 1982

CSKA September Flag (Bulgaria)	2–0 (a.e.t.)	(England) Liverpool
Mladenov 77', 101'	Report

Vasil Levski, Sofia
Attendance: 70,000

CSKA September Flag won on 2–1 on aggregate.

=== Semi finals ===
7 April 1982

CSKA September Flag (Bulgaria)	4–3	(West Germany) Bayern Munich
G. Dimitrov 7'; Yonchev 13' 49'; Zdravkov 18' (pen.)		Dürnberger 27'; D. Hoeneß 32'; Breitner 82'

Vasil Levsky, Sofia
Attendance: 70,000
Referee: Lambert France
21 April 1982

Bayern Munich (West Germany)	4–0	(Bulgaria) CSKA September Flag
Breitner 43', 47' (pen.); Rummenigge 65', 76'

Olympiastadion, Munich

Bayern Munich won 7–4 on aggregate.

== 1982–83 European Cup ==
=== First round ===
15 September 1982

AS Monaco (France)	0–0	(Bulgaria) CSKA Sofia

Nice
29 September 1982

CSKA Sofia (Bulgaria)	2–0 (a.e.t.)	(France) AS Monaco
Zdravkov 103' (pen.); Mladenov 112'

Sofia

CSKA Sofia won 2–0 on aggregate.

=== Second round ===
20 October 1982

CSKA Sofia (Bulgaria)	2–2	(Portugal) Sporting CP
Dzhevizov 10'; Mladenov 75'		Fernandes 31'; Xavier 80'

Sofia
3 November 1982

Sporting CP (Portugal)	0–0	(Bulgaria) CSKA Sofia

2–2 on aggregate; Sporting CP won on away goals.

== 1983–84 European Cup ==
=== First round ===
1983-09-14

CSKA Sofia (Bulgaria)	3–0	(Cyprus) Omonia
Mladenov 52'; Yonchev 56'; Slavkov 62'

Narodna Armiya Stadium, Sofia
1983-09-28

Omonia (Cyprus)	4–1	(Bulgaria) CSKA Sofia
Savvidis 42'; Arsov 48'; Kantalos 85'; Gregory 89'		Yonchev 22'

Nicosia

4–4 on aggregate; CSKA Sofia won on away goals.

=== Second round ===
1983-10-19

CSKA Sofia (Bulgaria)	0–1	(Italy) Roma
		Falcão 63'

Sofia
1983-11-02

Roma (Italy)	1–0	(Bulgaria) CSKA Sofia
Graziani 80'

Rome

Roma won 2–0 on aggregate.

== 1984–85 UEFA Cup ==
=== First round ===
19 September 1984

AS Monaco (France)	2–2	(Bulgaria) CSKA Sofia
Genghini 9', 19'		Slavkov 14'; Markov 16'

Monaco
3 October 1984

CSKA Sofia (Bulgaria)	2–1	(France) AS Monaco
Mladenov 7'; Zdravkov 14' (pen.)		Tibeuf 76'

Sofia

CSKA Sofia won 4–3 on aggregate.

=== Second round ===
24 October 1984

Hamburg (West Germany)	4–0	(Bulgaria) CSKA Sofia
McGhee 19' von Heesen 43', 90'; Magath 62'

Hamburg
7 November 1984

CSKA Sofia (Bulgaria)	1–2	(West Germany) Hamburg
Zdravkov 90'		Wuttke 8'; McGhee 52'

Sofia

Hamburg won 6–1 on aggregate.

== 1986–87 UEFA Cup ==
=== First round ===
18 September 1986

Swarovski Tirol (Austria)	3–0	(Bulgaria) Sredets Sofia
Roscher 11'; Pacult 47'; Linzmaier 78'

Innsbruck
1 October 1986

Sredets Sofia (Bulgaria)	2–0	(Austria) Swarovski Tirol
Tanev 35' (pen.); Kostadinov 80'

Sofia

Swarovski Tirol 3–2 on aggregate.

== 1987–88 European Cup ==
=== First round ===
16 September 1987

Bayern Munich (West Germany)	4–0	(Bulgaria) CFKA Sredets
Wegmann 30' 62'; Dorfner 35'; Brehme 55'

30 September 1987

CFKA Sredets (Bulgaria)	0–1	(West Germany) Bayern Munich
		Kögl 70'

Bayern Munich won 5–0 on aggregate.

== 1988–89 European Cup Winners' Cup ==
=== First round ===
7 September 1988

Inter Bratislava (Czech Republic)	2–3	(Bulgaria) CFKA Sredets
Moravetz 45'; Weis 70' (pen.)		Penev 36', 39' (pen.), 78'

Štadión Pasienky, Bratislava
Attendance: 4,500
5 October 1988

(Bulgaria) CFKA Sredets	5–0	Inter Bratislava (Czech Republic)
Penev 1' (pen.); Stoichkov 3'; Kostadinov 12', 38'; Getov 21'

Narodna Armia, Sofia
Attendance: 12,000

CFKA Sredets won 8–2 on aggregate.

=== Second round ===
26 October 1988

(Bulgaria) CFKA Sredets	2–0	(Greece) Panathinaikos
Stoichkov 45'; Penev 90' (pen.)

Narodna Armia, Sofia
Attendance: 22,000
9 November 1988

(Greece) Panathinaikos	0–1	(Bulgaria) CFKA Sredets
		Penev 85' (pen.)

Olympic Stadium, Athens
Attendance: 60,000

CFKA Sredets won 3–0 on aggregate.

=== Quarter-finals ===
1 March 1989

(Bulgaria) CFKA Sredets	2–1	Roda JC (Netherlands)
Stoichkov 12'; Kostadinov 64'		Boerebach 83'

Narodna Armia, Sofia
Attendance: 30,000
15 March 1989

Roda JC (Netherlands)	2–1 (a.e.t.)	(Bulgaria) CFKA Sredets
Haan 38'; Lohr 56'		Stoichkov 78'
Penalties
(penalty scored) Van der Luer; (penalty scored) Hanssen; (penalty missed) Groenendijk; (penalty scored) Haan; (penalty missed) Boerebach	3–4	Penev (penalty missed); Georgiev (penalty scored); Ivanov (penalty scored); Mladenov (penalty scored); Stoichkov (penalty scored)

Gemeentelijk Sportpark Kaalheide Kerkrade
Attendance: 20,000

3–3 on aggregate. Won 4–3 on penalties.

=== Semi-finals ===
4 April 1989

Barcelona (Spain)	4–2	(Bulgaria) CFKA Sredets
Lineker 36'; Amor 37'; Bakero 49'; Salinas 71'		Stoichkov 24', 66' (pen.)

Camp Nou, Barcelona
Attendance: 30,000
19 April 1989

(Bulgaria) CFKA Sredets	1–2	Barcelona (Spain)
Stoichkov 65'		Lineker 25'; Amor 81'

Vasil Levski Stadium, Sofia
Attendance: 50,000

Barcelona won 6–3 on aggregate.

== 1989–90 European Cup ==
=== First round ===
13 September 1989

Ruch Chorzów (Poland)	1–1	(Bulgaria) CSKA Sofia
Szewczyk 43'		Penev 18'

Silesian Stadium, Chorzów
Attendance: 15,000
27 September 1989

CSKA Sofia (Bulgaria)	5–1	(Poland) Ruch Chorzów
Georgiev 20', 49'; Bakalov 25'; Penev 80'; Vitanov 90'		Warzycha 87'

Narodna Armia, Sofia

CSKA Sofia won 6–2 on aggregate.

=== Second round ===
18 October 1989

Sparta Prague (Czechoslovakia)	2–2	(Bulgaria) CSKA Sofia
Bílek 75' (pen.); Skuhravý 84'		Stoichkov 13'; Kostadinov 57'

Letná Stadium, Prague
1 November 1989

CSKA Sofia (Bulgaria)	3–0	(Czechoslovakia) Sparta Prague
Stoichkov 45', 89' (pen.); Kostadinov 84'

Narodna Armia, Sofia

CSKA Sofia won 5–2 on aggregate.

=== Quarter-finals ===
7 March 1990

CSKA Sofia (Bulgaria)	0–1	(France) Marseille
		Thys 85'

Narodna Armia, Sofia
21 March 1990

Marseille (France)	3–1	(Bulgaria) CSKA Sofia
Waddle 25'; Papin 28'; Sauzée 72'		Urukov 84'

Stade Vélodrome, Marseille

Marseille won 4–1 on aggregate.

== 1990–91 European Cup ==
=== First round ===
19 September 1990

KA Akureyri (Iceland)	1–0	(Bulgaria) CSKA Sofia
Bragasson 17'

3 October 1990

CSKA Sofia (Bulgaria)	3–0	(Iceland) KA Akureyri
Marashliev 19', 80'; Georgiev 48'

CSKA Sofia won 3–1 on aggregate.

=== Second round ===
23 October 1990

Bayern Munich (West Germany)	4–0	(Bulgaria) CSKA Sofia
Reuter 3', 62' (pen.); Wohlfarth 28'; Augenthaler 54'

6 November 1990

CSKA Sofia (Bulgaria)	0–3	(West Germany) Bayern Munich
		Wohlfarth 16'; Effenberg 78'; McInally 84'

Bayern Munich won 7–0 on aggregate.

== 1991–92 UEFA Cup ==
=== First round ===
19 September 1991

CSKA Sofia (Bulgaria)	0–0	(Italy) Parma

Sofia
2 October 1991

Parma (Italy)	1–1	(Bulgaria) CSKA Sofia
Agostini 72'		Parushev 88'

Parma

1–1 on aggregate; CSKA Sofia won on away goals.

=== Second round ===
Hamburger SV (West Germany)	2–0	(Bulgaria) CSKA Sofia

Hamburg

CSKA Sofia (Bulgaria)	1–4	(West Germany) Hamburg

Sofia

Hamburg won 6–1 on aggregate.

== 1992–93 UEFA Champions League ==
=== First round ===
16 September 1992

Austria Wien	3–1	(Bulgaria) CSKA Sofia
Hasenhüttl 16'; Fridrikas 82'; Kogler 90'		Shishkov 57'

Franz Horr Stadium, Wien
30 September 1992

CSKA Sofia (Bulgaria)	3–2	Austria Wien
Metkov 2'; Andonov 60'; Draganov 73'		Flögel 28'; Ivanauskas 67'

Balgarska Armiya Stadium, Sofia
Attendance: 8,000

Austria Wien won 5–4 on aggregate.

== 1993–94 European Cup Winners' Cup ==
15 September 1993
17:30

CSKA Sofia (Bulgaria)	8–0	(Liechtenstein) Balzers
Shishkov 12', 21', 54', 69'; Andonov 47', 50'; Nankov 68' (pen.), 88'	Report

Vasil Levski National Stadium, Sofia
Attendance: 6,200
Referee: Charles Agius (Malta)
29 September 1993
20:00

Balzers (Liechtenstein)	1–3	(Bulgaria) CSKA Sofia
Kuster 63'	Report	Andonov 32'; Tanev 53'; Ćirić 90'

Sportplatz Rheinau, Balzers
Attendance: 1,200
Referee: Georgios Michanikos (Cyprus)

CSKA Sofia won 11–1 on aggregate.

=== Second round ===
20 October 1993
16:00

Benfica (Portugal)	3–1	(Bulgaria) CSKA Sofia
Rui Costa 27', 37'; Schwarz 90'	Report	Andonov 60'

Estádio da Luz, Lisbon
Attendance: 40,000
Referee: Patrick Kelly (Republic of Ireland)
3 November 1993
17:30

CSKA Sofia (Bulgaria)	1–3	(Portugal) Benfica
Andonov 56'	Report	Rui Costa 31'; João Pinto 73'; Yuran 89'

Vasil Levski National Stadium, Sofia
Attendance: 20,750
Referee: Rune Pedersen (Norway)

Benfica won 6–2 on aggregate.

== 1994–95 UEFA Cup ==
=== Preliminary round ===
9 August 1994

CSKA Sofia (Bulgaria)	3–0	(Armenia) Ararat Yerevan
Tanev 21' (pen.); Koilov 45'; Shishkov 74'

Balgarska Armiya Stadium, Sofia
Attendance: 6,000
23 August 1994

(Armenia) Ararat Yerevan	0–0	(Bulgaria) CSKA Sofia

Hrazdan Stadium, Erevan
Attendance: 12,000

CSKA Sofia won 3–0 on aggregate.

=== First round ===
13 September 1994

CSKA Sofia (Bulgaria)	3–2	(Italy) Juventus
Mihtarski 44', 82'; Radukanov 70'		Porrini 35'; Del Piero 75'

Balgarska Armiya Stadium, Sofia
Attendance: 15,000

UEFA invalidated this game and awarded a 3–0 win to Juventus because CSKA fielded an ineligible player, Petar Mihtarski.

27 September 1994

Juventus (Italy)	5–1	(Bulgaria) CSKA Sofia
Ravanelli 9', 65', 69', 81', 83'		Mihtarski 90'

Stadio Delle Alpi Turin
Attendance: 35,000

Juventus won 8–1 on aggregate.

== 1997–98 UEFA Champions League ==
=== First qualifying round ===
23 July 1997

(Romania) Steaua București	3–3	(Bulgaria) CSKA Sofia
Rotariu 8'; Lăcătuș 77'; Munteanu 83'		Andonov 47'; Nankov 49', 67'

Ghencea Stadium, Bucharest
Attendance: 10,000
30 July 1997

CSKA Sofia (Bulgaria)	0–2	(Romania) Steaua București
		Șerban 34'; Reghecampf 48'

Balgarska Armiya Stadium, Sofia
Attendance: 30,000

Steaua București won 5–3 on aggregate.

== 1998–99 UEFA Cup ==
=== First qualifying round ===
22 July 1998

(Belarus) Belshina Bobruisk	0–0	(Bulgaria) CSKA Sofia

Dinamo Stadium, Minsk
Attendance: 3,000
29 July 1998

CSKA Sofia (Bulgaria)	3–1	(Belarus) Belshina Bobruisk
Petrov 6'; Naydenov 37'; Stanchev 90'		Balashov 50'

Balgarska Armiya Stadium, Sofia
Attendance: 10,000

CSKA Sofia won 3–1 on aggregate.

=== Second qualifying round ===
11 August 1998

(Norway) Molde	0–0	(Bulgaria) CSKA Sofia

Aker Stadion, Molde
Attendance: 3,000
25 August 1998

CSKA Sofia (Bulgaria)	2–0	(Norway) Molde
Petkov 39'; Stanchev 60'

Balgarska Armiya Stadium, Sofia
Attendance: 16,000

CSKA Sofia won 2–0 on aggregate.

=== First round ===
15 September 1998

(Switzerland) Servette	2–1	(Bulgaria) CSKA Sofia
Pistinat 86'; Melunovic 89'		Stanchev 45'

Charmilles Stadium, Geneva
Attendance: 4,500
29 September 1998

CSKA Sofia (Bulgaria)	1–0	(Switzerland) Servette
Stanchev 53'

Balgarska Armiya Stadium, Sofia
Attendance: 20,000

2–2 on aggregate; CSKA Sofia won on away goals.

=== Second round ===
20 October 1998

CSKA Sofia (Bulgaria)	2–4	(Spain) Atlético Madrid
Genchev 53'; Naydenov 84'		Torizzi 42'; Kikko 44'; Roberto 75'; Kikko 88'

Balgarska Armiya Stadium, Sofia
Attendance: 25,000
3 November 1998

(Spain) Atlético Madrid	1–0	(Bulgaria) CSKA Sofia
Juninho 45' (pen.)

Vicente Calderón, Madrid
Attendance: 20,000

Atlético Madrid won 5–2 on aggregate.

== 1999–2000 UEFA Cup ==
=== Qualifying round ===
12 August 1999

(Northern Ireland) Portadown	0–3	(Bulgaria) CSKA Sofia
		Manchev 1'; Kovačević 77'; Bukarev 86'

Shamrock Park, Portadown
Attendance: 1,000
24 August 1999

CSKA Sofia (Bulgaria)	5–0	(Northern Ireland) Portadown
Petkov 15' (pen.); Litera 29', 51'; Hristov 62' (pen.); Simeonov 81'

Balgarska Armiya Stadium, Sofia
Attendance: 10,000

CSKA Sofia won 8–0 on aggregate.

=== First round ===
16 September 1999

CSKA Sofia (Bulgaria)	0–2	(England) Newcastle United
		Solano 51'; Ketsbaia 77'

Balgarska Armiya Stadium, Sofia
Attendance: 30,000
1 October 1999

(England) Newcastle United	2–2	(Bulgaria) CSKA Sofia
Shearer 36'; Robinson 88'		Litera 29'; Simeonov 90'

St James' Park, Newcastle
Attendance: 36,228

Newcastle United won 4–2 on aggregate.

== 2000–01 UEFA Cup ==
=== Qualifying round ===
10 August 2000

(Moldova) Constructorul Chișinău	2–3	(Bulgaria) CSKA Sofia
Druta 26'; Zabolotnij 83'		Berbatov 6', 21'; Mirchev 85'

Chișinău
24 August 2000

CSKA Sofia (Bulgaria)	8–0	(Moldova) Constructorul Chișinău
Yanchev 16'; Stefanov 19'; Berbatov 36', 42', 44', 53', 77'; Yanev 79'

Balgarska Armiya Stadium, Sofia

CSKA Sofia won 11–2 on aggregate.

=== First round ===
14 September 2000

CSKA Sofia (Bulgaria)	1–2	(Hungary) MTK Hungária
Yanev 7'		Ferenczi 50'; Kuttor 70'

Balgarska Armiya Stadium, Sofia
28 September 2000

(Hungary) MTK Hungária	0–1	(Bulgaria) CSKA Sofia
		Mirchev 85' (pen.)

Hidegkuti Nándor Stadium, Budapest

2–2 on aggregate; MTK Hungária won on away goals.

== 2001–02 UEFA Cup ==
=== Qualifying round ===
9 August 2001

(Belarus) Shakhtyor Soligorsk	1–2	(Bulgaria) CSKA Sofia
Bezborodov 82'		Manchev 63'; Giglio 81'

Dinamo Stadium, Minsk
Attendance: 10,000
23 August 2001

CSKA Sofia (Bulgaria)	3–1	(Belarus) Shakhtyor Soligorsk
Manchev 16', 63'; Giglio 68'		Bezborodov 90'

Balgarska Armiya Stadium, Sofia
Attendance: 10,000

CSKA Sofia won 5–2 on aggregate.

=== First round ===
20 September 2001

CSKA Sofia (Bulgaria)	3–0	(Ukraine) Shakhtar Donetsk
Manchev 24', 80'; Penev 40'

Balgarska Armiya Stadium, Sofia
Attendance: 13,000
27 September 2001

(Ukraine) Shakhtar Donetsk	2–1	(Bulgaria) CSKA Sofia
Vorobey 30', 51'		Deyanov 90'

Shakhtar Stadium, Donetsk
Attendance: 30,000

CSKA Sofia won 4–2 on aggregate.

=== Second round ===
18 October 2001

AC Milan (Italy)	2–0	(Bulgaria) CSKA Sofia
Costa 20'; Shevchenko 51'

Stadio Giuseppe Meazza, Milan
Attendance: 23,000
1 November 2001

CSKA Sofia (Bulgaria)	0–1	(Italy) Milan
		Inzaghi 62'

Balgarska Armiya Stadium, Sofia
Attendance: 22,000

Milan won 3–0 on aggregate.

== 2002–03 UEFA Cup ==
=== Qualifying round ===
15 August 2002

(Belarus) Dinamo Minsk	1–4	(Bulgaria) CSKA Sofia
Tsyhalka 66'		Mukasi 18'; Dimitrov 28', 47'; Brito 31'

Dinamo Stadium, Minsk
Attendance: 15,000
29 August 2002

CSKA Sofia (Bulgaria)	1–0	(Belarus) Dinamo Minsk
Šakiri 64' (pen.)

Balgarska Armiya Stadium, Sofia
Attendance: 10,000

CSKA Sofia won 5–1 on aggregate.

=== First round ===
19 September 2002

(England) Blackburn Rovers	1–1	(Bulgaria) CSKA Sofia
Grabbi 25'		Dimitrov 22'

Ewood Park, Blackburn
Attendance: 32,000
3 October 2002

CSKA Sofia (Bulgaria)	3–3	(England) Blackburn Rovers
Gargorov 65'; Agnaldo 71'; Gargorov 89' (pen.)		Thompson 30'; Estnestadt 55'; Duff 56'

Balgarska Armiya Stadium, Sofia
Attendance: 22,000

4–4 on aggregate; Blackburn Rovers won on away goals.

== 2003–04 UEFA Champions League ==
=== Second qualifying round ===
30 July 2003

(Armenia) Pyunik	0–2	(Bulgaria) CSKA Sofia
		Yanchev 20'; Mukasi 48'

Republican Stadium, Yerevan
Attendance: 15,000
6 August 2003

CSKA Sofia (Bulgaria)	1–0	(Armenia) Pyunik
Lima 90' (pen.)

Balgarska Armiya Stadium, Sofia
Attendance: 12,000

CSKA Sofia won 3–0 on aggregate.

=== Third qualifying round ===
13 August 2003

(Turkey) Galatasaray	3–0	(Bulgaria) CSKA Sofia
Şaş 3'; Şükür 5'; Erdem 37'

Atatürk, Istanbul
Attendance: 65,000
27 August 2003

CSKA Sofia (Bulgaria)	0–3	(Turkey) Galatasaray
		Prates 28'; Sarıoğlu 53'; Erdem 86'

Balgarska Armiya Stadium, Sofia
Attendance: 15,000

Galatasaray won 6–0 on aggregate.

== 2003–04 UEFA Cup ==
=== First round ===
24 September 2003

CSKA Sofia (Bulgaria)	1–1	(Russia) Torpedo Moscow
Dimitrov 18'		Semshov 78'

Balgarska Armiya Stadium, Sofia
Attendance: 20,000
15 October 2003

(Russia) Torpedo Moscow	1–1 (a.e.t.)	(Bulgaria) CSKA Sofia
Oper 11'		Dimitrov 90+3'

Torpedo Stadium, Moscow
Attendance: 2,500

2–2 on aggregate; Torpedo Moscow won 3–2 on penalties.

== 2004–05 UEFA Cup ==
=== Second qualifying round ===
10 August 2004

(Cyprus) Omonia	1–1	(Bulgaria) CSKA Sofia
Kozley 57'		Mujiri 79'

GSP Stadium, Nicosia
Attendance: 17,000
26 August 2004

CSKA Sofia (Bulgaria)	3–1 (a.e.t.)	(Cyprus) Omonia
Mujiri 90+3'; Sakaliev 111'; Hazurov 116'		Stepanovich 78'

Balgarska Armiya Stadium, Sofia
Attendance: 13,000

CSKA Sofia won 4–2 on aggregate.

=== First round ===
16 September 2004

(Romania) Steaua București	2–1	(Bulgaria) CSKA Sofia
Neaga 9'; Dică 80'		Yanev 28'

Ghencea Stadium, Bucharest
Attendance: 25,000
30 September 2004

CSKA Sofia (Bulgaria)	2–2	(Romania) Steaua București
Sakaliev 45'; Gargorov 75'		Oprița 14'; Paraschiv 34'

Balgarska Armiya Stadium, Sofia
Attendance: 20,000

Steaua București won 4–3 on aggregate.

== 2005–06 UEFA Champions League ==
=== Second qualifying round ===
27 July 2005

KF Tirana (Albania)	0–2	(Bulgaria) CSKA Sofia
		Gueye 89'; Gargorov 90+'

Qemal Stafa Stadium, Tirana
Attendance: 10,000
3 August 2005

CSKA Sofia (Bulgaria)	2–0	(Albania) KF Tirana
Zadi 2'; Todorov 90' (pen.)

Balgarska Armiya Stadium, Sofia
Attendance: 5,000

CSKA Sofia won 4–0 on aggregate.

=== Third qualifying round ===
10 August 2005

CSKA Sofia (Bulgaria)	1–3	(England) Liverpool
Dimitrov 45'		Cissé 25'; Morientes 31', 58'

Vasil Levski National Stadium, Sofia
Attendance: 20,000
23 August 2005

Liverpool (England)	0–1	(Bulgaria) CSKA Sofia
		Iliev 15'

Anfield, Liverpool
Attendance: 43,000

Liverpool won 3–2 on aggregate.

== 2005–06 UEFA Cup ==
=== First round ===
15 September 2005

(Germany) Bayer Leverkusen	0–1	(Bulgaria) CSKA Sofia
		Todorov 15'

BayArena, Leverkusen
Attendance: 20,000
29 September 2005

CSKA Sofia (Bulgaria)	1–0	(Germany) Bayer Leverkusen
Hdiouad 67'

Balgarska Armiya Stadium, Sofia
Attendance: 22,500

CSKA Sofia won 2–0 on aggregate.

=== Group A ===
20 October 2005

CSKA Sofia (Bulgaria)	0–1	(Germany) Hamburger SV
		Van der Vaart 58'

Balgarska Armiya Stadium, Sofia
Attendance: 22,000
3 November 2005

(Czech Republic) Slavia Prague	4–2	(Bulgaria) CSKA Sofia
Fořt 5', 73'; Vlček 36'; Piták 56'		Gargorov 10'; Sakaliev 57'

Stadion Evžena Rošického, Prague
Attendance: 8,000
30 November 2005

CSKA Sofia (Bulgaria)	2–0	(Norway) Viking
Yanev 35' (pen.); Guillaume 46'

Balgarska Armiya Stadium, Sofia
Attendance: 10,000
15 December 2005

(France) Monaco	2–1	(Bulgaria) CSKA Sofia
Kapo 49'; Squillaci 75'		Dimitrov 84'

Stade Louis II, Monaco
Attendance: 6,000

Pos	Team	Pld	W	D	L	GF	GA	GD	Pts	Qualification	MON	HSV	SLA	VIK	CSS
1	(France) Monaco	4	3	0	1	6	2	+4	9	Advance to knockout stage	—	2–0	—	—	2–1
2	(Germany) Hamburger SV	4	3	0	1	5	2	+3	9	Advance to knockout stage	—	—	2–0	2–0	—
3	(Czech Republic) Slavia Prague	4	1	1	2	6	8	−2	4	Advance to knockout stage	0–2	—	—	—	4–2
4	(Norway) Viking	4	1	1	2	3	6	−3	4		1–0	—	2–2	—	—
5	(Bulgaria) CSKA Sofia	4	1	0	3	5	7	−2	3		—	0–1	—	2–0	—

== 2006–07 UEFA Cup ==
=== First qualifying round ===
13 July 2006

(Albania) Dinamo Tirana	0–1	(Bulgaria) CSKA Sofia
		Trika 86'

Selma Surmasi Stadium, Tirana
Attendance: 1,130
27 July 2006

CSKA Sofia (Bulgaria)	4–1	(Albania) Dinamo Tirana
Trika 36'; Furtado 50'; Trika 53'; Petre 75'		Castel 12'

Balgarska Armiya Stadium, Sofia
Attendance: 3,500

CSKA Sofia won 5–1 on aggregate.

=== Second qualifying round ===
10 August 2006

CSKA Sofia (Bulgaria)	0–0	(Serbia) Hajduk Kula

Balgarska Armiya Stadium, Sofia
Attendance: 4,250
24 August 2006

(Serbia) Hajduk Kula	1–1 (a.e.t.)	(Bulgaria) CSKA Sofia
Stančić 99'		Tunchev 120'

Stadion Crvena Zvezda, Belgrade
Attendance: 770

1–1 on aggregate; CSKA Sofia won on away goals.

=== First round ===
14 September 2006

(Turkey) Beşiktaş	2–0	(Bulgaria) CSKA Sofia
Kléberson 81'; Gökhan 90+1'

İsmet İnönü, Istanbul
Attendance: 30,000
28 September 2006

CSKA Sofia (Bulgaria)	2–2 (a.e.t.)	(Turkey) Beşiktaş
Iliev 60'; Tunchev 69'		Nobre 95'; Bobô 100'

Balgarska Armiya Stadium, Sofia
Attendance: 15,000

Beşiktaş won 4–2 on aggregate.

== 2007–08 UEFA Cup ==
=== Second qualifying round ===
16 August 2007
19:00 CET

Omonia (Cyprus)	1–1	CSKA Sofia (Bulgaria)
Kaiafas 14'		Nei 1'

GSP Stadium, Nicosia
Attendance: 15,000
Referee: Martin Atkinson
30 August 2007
19:30 CET

CSKA Sofia (Bulgaria)	2–1	Omonia (Cyprus)
Nei 17'; Chilikov 88'		Magno 8'

Balgarska Armiya Stadium, Sofia
Attendance: 16,500
Referee: Serge Gumienny

CSKA Sofia won 3–2 on aggregate.

=== First round ===
20 September 2007

Toulouse (France)	0–0	(Bulgaria) CSKA Sofia

Stadium Municipal, Toulouse
Attendance: 18,000
Referee: Nicolai Vollquartz
4 October 2007

(Bulgaria) CSKA Sofia	1–1	Toulouse (France)
Nei 65' (pen.)		Gignac 90+6'

Balgarska Armiya Stadium, Sofia
Attendance: 22,000
Referee: Bernhard Bruger

1–1 on aggregate; Toulouse won on away goals.

== 2009–10 UEFA Europa League ==
=== Third qualifying round ===
30 July 2009
19:00

CSKA Sofia (Bulgaria)	1–0	(Republic of Ireland) Derry City
Stoyanov 74'	Report

Vasil Levski National Stadium, Sofia ^{43}
Attendance: 10,500
Referee: Selçuk Dereli (Turkey)
6 August 2009
20:00

Derry City (Republic of Ireland)	1–1	(Bulgaria) CSKA Sofia
Scullion 82'	Report	Marquinhos 70'

Brandywell Stadium, Derry
Attendance: 5,000
Referee: Jérome Efong Nzolo (Belgium)

CSKA Sofia won 2–1 on aggregate.

=== Play-off round ===
20 August 2009
19:00

CSKA Sofia (Bulgaria)	0–0	(Russia) Dynamo Moscow
	Report

Vasil Levski National Stadium, Sofia ^{58}
Attendance: 23,250
Referee: Robert Schörgenhofer (Austria)
27 August 2009
18:00

Dynamo Moscow (Russia)	1–2	(Bulgaria) CSKA Sofia
Kerzhakov 10'	Report	Delev 14'; Ivanov 56'

Arena Khimki, Khimki ^{64}
Attendance: 8,486
Referee: Michael Weiner (Germany)

CSKA Sofia won 2–1 on aggregate.

=== Group E ===
17 September 2009
19:00

CSKA Sofia (Bulgaria)	1–1	(England) Fulham
Michel Platini 62'	Report	Kamara 65'

Vasil Levski National Stadium, Sofia ^{5}
Attendance: 38,000
Referee: Darko Čeferin (Slovenia)
1 October 2009
21:05

Roma (Italy)	2–0	(Bulgaria) CSKA Sofia
Okaka 19'; Perrotta 23'	Report

Stadio Olimpico, Rome
Attendance: 20,000
Referee: Vladimír Hriňák (Slovakia)
22 October 2009
21:05

CSKA Sofia (Bulgaria)	0–2	(Switzerland) Basel
	Report	Frei 20', 63'

Vasil Levski National Stadium, Sofia ^{5}
Attendance: 17,000
Referee: Manuel De Sousa (Portugal)
5 November 2009
19:00

Basel (Switzerland)	3–1	(Bulgaria) CSKA Sofia
Gelabert 35'; Frei 41' (pen.), 67'	Report	Yanchev 61'

St. Jakob-Park, Basel
Attendance: 15,255
Referee: Oleg Oriekhov (Ukraine)
3 December 2009
21:05

Fulham (England)	1–0	(Bulgaria) CSKA Sofia
Gera 15'	Report

Craven Cottage, London
Attendance: 23,604
Referee: Cristian Balaj (Romania)
16 December 2009
19:00

CSKA Sofia (Bulgaria)	0–3	(Italy) Roma
	Report	Cerci 45+1', 52'; Scardina 89'

Vasil Levski National Stadium, Sofia ^{5}
Attendance: 10,000
Referee: Aleksandar Stavrev (Macedonia)

Pos	Team	Pld	W	D	L	GF	GA	GD	Pts	Qualification	ROM	FUL	BSL	CSK
1	(Italy) Roma	6	4	1	1	10	5	+5	13	Advance to knockout phase	—	2–1	2–1	2–0
2	(England) Fulham	6	3	2	1	8	6	+2	11	Advance to knockout phase	1–1	—	1–0	1–0
3	(Switzerland) Basel	6	3	0	3	10	7	+3	9		2–0	2–3	—	3–1
4	(Bulgaria) CSKA Sofia	6	0	1	5	2	12	−10	1		0–3	1–1	0–2	—

Source: Soccerway

== 2010–11 UEFA Europa League ==
=== Third qualifying round ===
27 July 2010
18:00

CSKA Sofia (Bulgaria)	3–0	(Northern Ireland) Cliftonville
Vidanov 9'; Marquinhos 72'; Trifonov 74'	Report

Vasil Levski National Stadium, Sofia^{50}
Referee: Gediminas Mažeika (Lithuania)
5 August 2010
20:45

Cliftonville (Northern Ireland)	1–2	(Bulgaria) CSKA Sofia
Boyce 42'	Report	Kostadinov 85'; Marquinhos 88'

Windsor Park, Belfast^{60}
Attendance: 776
Referee: Gediminas Mažeika (Lithuania)

CSKA Sofia won 5–1 on aggregate.

=== Play-off round ===
19 August 2010
20:30

CSKA Sofia (Bulgaria)	3–0	(Wales) The New Saints
Aquaro 81'; Nelson 82'; Delev 90'	Report

Vasil Levski National Stadium, Sofia^{66}
Attendance: 2,950
Referee: Hannes Kaasik (Estonia)
26 August 2010
20:35

The New Saints (Wales)	2–2	(Bulgaria) CSKA Sofia
M. Williams 13'; Evans 61'	Report	Aquaro 10'; Tiboni 79'

Racecourse Ground, Wrexham^{70}
Attendance: 843
Referee: Tony Asumaa (Finland)

CSKA Sofia won 5–2 on aggregate.

=== Group L ===
16 September 2010
21:05

Beşiktaş (Turkey)	1–0	(Bulgaria) CSKA Sofia
Ernst 90'	Report

BJK İnönü Stadium, Istanbul
Attendance: 25,035
Referee: Laurent Duhamel (France)
30 September 2010
19:00

CSKA Sofia (Bulgaria)	0–1	(Portugal) Porto
	Report	Falcao 16'

Vasil Levski National Stadium, Sofia^{4}
Attendance: 17,231
Referee: Alon Yefet (Israel)
21 October 2010
19:00

CSKA Sofia (Bulgaria)	0–2	(Austria) Rapid Wien
	Report	Vennegoor of Hesselink 28'; Hofmann 32'

Vasil Levski National Stadium, Sofia^{4}
Attendance: 12,000
Referee: Leontios Trattou (Cyprus)
4 November 2010
21:05

Rapid Wien (Austria)	1–2	(Bulgaria) CSKA Sofia
Salihi 56' (pen.)	Report	Yanchev 50'; Marquinhos 64'

Ernst-Happel-Stadion, Vienna^{3}
Attendance: 48,000
Referee: Simon Lee Evans (Wales)
2 December 2010
19:00

CSKA Sofia (Bulgaria)	1–2	(Turkey) Beşiktaş
Sheridan 79'	Report	Zápotočný 59'; Hološko 64'

Vasil Levski National Stadium, Sofia^{4}
Attendance: 10,000
Referee: Tom Harald Hagen (Norway)
15 December 2010
21:05

Porto (Portugal)	3–1	(Bulgaria) CSKA Sofia
Otamendi 22'; Micael 54'; J. Rodríguez 90+3'	Report	Delev 48'

Estádio do Dragão, Porto
Attendance: 22,930
Referee: Claudio Circhetta (Switzerland)

Pos	Team	Pld	W	D	L	GF	GA	GD	Pts	Qualification	POR	BJK	RPD	CSS
1	(Portugal) Porto	6	5	1	0	14	4	+10	16	Advance to knockout phase	—	1–1	3–0	3–1
2	(Turkey) Beşiktaş	6	4	1	1	9	6	+3	13	Advance to knockout phase	1–3	—	2–0	1–0
3	(Austria) Rapid Wien	6	1	0	5	5	12	−7	3		1–3	1–2	—	1–2
4	(Bulgaria) CSKA Sofia	6	1	0	5	4	10	−6	3		0–1	1–2	0–2	—

Source: Soccerway

== 2011–12 UEFA Europa League ==
=== Play-off round ===
18 August 2011
19:30

Steaua București (Romania)	2–0	(Bulgaria) CSKA Sofia
Galamaz 16'; Leandro Tatu 77'	Report

Stadionul Dr. Constantin Rădulescu, Cluj-Napoca
Attendance: 20,700
Referee: Tommy Skjerven (Norway)
25 August 2011
19:30

CSKA Sofia (Bulgaria)	1–1	(Romania) Steaua București
Michel 83'	Report	Tănase 73'

Vasil Levski National Stadium, Sofia
Attendance: 27,200
Referee: Pol van Boekel (Netherlands)

Steaua București won 3–1 on aggregate.

== 2012–13 UEFA Europa League ==
=== Second qualifying round ===
19 July 2012
20:00

Mura 05 (Slovenia)	0–0	(Bulgaria) CSKA Sofia
	Report

Športni park, Lendava
Attendance: 2,200
Referee: Lee Probert (England)
26 July 2012
20:00

(Bulgaria) CSKA Sofia	1–1	(Slovenia) Mura 05
Popov 18'	Report	Fajić 88'

Vasil Levski National Stadium, Sofia,
Attendance: 5,800
Referee: Hannes Kaasik (Estonia)

1–1 on aggregate; Mura 05 won on away goals.

== 2014–15 UEFA Europa League ==
=== Second qualifying round ===
17 July 2014
19:30

CSKA Sofia (Bulgaria)	1–1	(Moldova) Zimbru Chișinău
Karachanakov 41'	Report	Alexeev 31'

Vasil Levski National Stadium, Sofia
Attendance: 7,500
Referee: Barış Şimşek (Turkey)
24 July 2014
19:00

Zimbru Chișinău (Moldova)	0–0	(Bulgaria) CSKA Sofia
	Report

Stadionul Zimbru, Chișinău
Attendance: 8,505
Referee: Marco Fritz (Germany)

1–1 on aggregate; Zimbru Chișinău won on away goals.

== 2018–19 UEFA Europa League ==
=== First qualifying round ===
12 July 2018
19:45

CSKA Sofia (Bulgaria)	1–0	(Latvia) Riga FC
Rodrigues 49'	Report

Balgarska Armia Stadium, Sofia
Attendance: 7,500
Referee: Mario Zebec (Croatia)
19 July 2018
18:30

Riga FC (Latvia)	1−0	(Bulgaria) CSKA Sofia
Černomordijs 44'	Report
Penalties
Lemajić (penalty missed); Primão (penalty scored); Kārkliņš (penalty scored); Bayenko (penalty scored)	3−5	(penalty scored) Malinov; (penalty scored) Bodurov; (penalty scored) Geferson; (penalty scored) Gyasi; (penalty scored) Despodov

Skonto Stadium, Riga
Attendance: 3,100
Referee: Furkat Atazhanov (Kazakhstan)

1–1 on aggregate. CSKA won 5−3 on penalty shootout.

=== Second qualifying round ===
26 July 2018
20:00

CSKA Sofia (Bulgaria)	3–0	(Austria) Admira Wacker Mödling
Despodov 29', 34'; Maurides 38' (pen.)	Report

Balgarska Armia Stadium, Sofia
Attendance: 6,200
Referee: John Beaton (Scotland)
2 August 2018
20:00

Admira Wacker Mödling (Austria)	1–3	(Bulgaria) CSKA Sofia
Bakış 55'	Report	Maurides 14', 53'; Jorginho 80'

BSFZ-Arena, Maria Enzersdorf
Attendance: 2,400
Referee: Pol van Boekel (Netherlands)

CSKA Sofia won 6–1 on aggregate.

=== Third qualifying round ===
9 August 2018
19:45

CSKA Sofia (Bulgaria)	1−2	(Denmark) Copenhagen
Maurides 15'	Report	Vavro 64'; Kodro 74' (pen.)

Vasil Levski National Stadium, Sofia
Attendance: 21,100
Referee: Bart Vertenten (Belgium)
16 August 2018
18:30

Copenhagen (Denmark)	2−1	(Bulgaria) CSKA Sofia
N'Doye 23', 64'	Report	Evandro 58'

Parken, Copenhagen
Attendance: 10,078
Referee: Halil Umut Meler (Turkey)

Copenhagen won 4–2 on aggregate.

== 2019–20 UEFA Europa League ==
=== First qualifying round ===
9 July 2019
20:30 EEST

CSKA Sofia (Bulgaria)	4−0	(Montenegro) Titograd
Evandro 40'; Tiago 53'; Geferson 55'; Malinov 72'	Report

Stadion Balgarska Armiya, Sofia, Bulgaria
Attendance: 8,500
Referee: Luís Godinho (Portugal)
16 July 2019
21:30 EEST

Titograd (Montenegro)	0−0	(Bulgaria) CSKA Sofia
	Report

Stadion pod Goricom, Podgorica, Montenegro
Attendance: 969
Referee: Vasilis Dimitriou (Cyprus)

CSKA Sofia won 4–0 on aggregate.

=== Second qualifying round ===
25 July 2019
20:30 EEST
First leg

CSKA Sofia (Bulgaria)	1−0	(Croatia) Osijek
Evandro 53'	Report

Stadion Balgarska Armiya, Sofia, Bulgaria
Attendance: 7,500
Referee: Paolo Valeri (Italy)
1 August 2019
21:45 EEST
Second leg

Osijek (Croatia)	1−0 (a.e.t.)	(Bulgaria) CSKA Sofia
Majstorović 28'	Report
Penalties
Lyopa (penalty scored); Bočkaj (penalty missed); Škorić (penalty missed); Pilj (penalty scored); Marić (penalty scored)	3−4	(penalty scored) Tiago; (penalty scored) Carey; (penalty missed) Geferson; (penalty scored) Bodurov; (penalty scored) Sowe

Stadion Gradski vrt, Osijek, Croatia
Attendance: 7,214
Referee: Robert Schörgenhofer (Austria)

1–1 on aggregate. CSKA won 4−3 on penalty shootout.

=== Third qualifying round ===
8 August 2019
20:30 EEST

CSKA Sofia (Bulgaria)	1−1	(Ukraine) Zorya Luhansk
Evandro 13'	Report	Yurchenko 45+1' (pen.)

Natsionalen stadion Vasil Levski, Sofia, Bulgaria
Attendance: 15,310
Referee: Sandro Schärer (Switzerland)
15 August 2019
20:00 EEST

Zorya Luhansk (Ukraine)	1−0	(Bulgaria) CSKA Sofia
Rusyn 89'	Report

Slavutych-Arena, Zaporizhia, Ukraine
Attendance: 7,857
Referee: Amaury Delerue (France)

Zorya Luhansk won 2–1 on aggregate.

== 2020–21 UEFA Europa League ==
=== First qualifying round ===
27 August 2020
19:00 (20:00 EEST)

CSKA Sofia (Bulgaria)	2–1	(Malta) Sirens
Ahmedov 75'; Sowe 90+1'	Report	Maxuell 69'

Stadion Balgarska Armia, Sofia
Attendance: 0
Referee: Krzysztof Jakubik (Poland)

=== Second qualifying round ===
17 September 2020
19:00 (20:00 EEST)

CSKA Sofia (Bulgaria)	2–0	(Belarus) BATE Borisov
Sowe 44'; Carey 90+5'	Report

Bulgarian Army Stadium, Sofia
Attendance: 0
Referee: Horațiu Feșnic (Romania)

=== Third qualifying round ===
24 September 2020
19:00 (20:00 EEST)

CSKA Sofia (Bulgaria)	3–1	(Faroe Islands) B36 Tórshavn
Sowe 27'; Yomov 38'; Keita 83'	Report	Pingel 61'

Bulgarian Army Stadium, Sofia
Attendance: 0
Referee: Tamás Bognár (Hungary)

=== Play-off round ===
1 October 2020
20:30

Basel (Switzerland)	1–3	(Bulgaria) CSKA Sofia
Cabral 54' (pen.)	Report	Rodrigues 72', 88'; Ahmedov 90+7'

St. Jakob-Park, Basel
Attendance: 0
Referee: Ivan Kružliak (Slovakia)

=== Group A ===
22 October 2020
18:55

CSKA Sofia (Bulgaria)	0–2	(Romania) CFR Cluj
	Report	Rondón 53'; Deac 74' (pen.)

Vasil Levski National Stadium, Sofia (Note: CSKA Sofia play their home matches at Vasil Levski National Stadium, Sofia, instead of their regular home stadium Stadion Balgarska Armia, Sofia.)
Attendance: 12,000
Referee: Halil Umut Meler (Turkey)
29 October 2020
21:00

Roma (Italy)	0–0	(Bulgaria) CSKA Sofia
	Report

Stadio Olimpico, Rome
Attendance: 0
Referee: Aleksei Kulbakov (Belarus)
5 November 2020
21:00

Young Boys (Switzerland)	3−0	(Bulgaria) CSKA Sofia
Mambimbi 2', 32'; Sulejmani 19'	Report

Stadion Wankdorf, Bern
Attendance: 0
Referee: Lawrence Visser (Belgium)
26 November 2020
18:55

CSKA Sofia (Bulgaria)	0−1	(Switzerland) Young Boys
	Report	Nsame 34'

Vasil Levski National Stadium, Sofia
Attendance: 0
Referee: Fábio Veríssimo (Portugal)
3 December 2020
21:00

CFR Cluj (Romania)	0–0	(Bulgaria) CSKA Sofia
	Report

Stadionul Dr. Constantin Rădulescu, Cluj-Napoca
Attendance: 0
Referee: Peter Bankes (France)
10 December 2020
18:55

CSKA Sofia (Bulgaria)	3−1	(Italy) Roma
Rodrigues 5'; Sowe 34', 55'	Report	Milanese 22'

Vasil Levski National Stadium, Sofia
Attendance: 0
Referee: Irfan Peljto (Bosnia and Herzegovina)

Pos	Team	Pld	W	D	L	GF	GA	GD	Pts	Qualification
1	(Italy) Roma	6	4	1	1	13	5	+8	13	Advance to knockout phase
2	(Switzerland) Young Boys	6	3	1	2	9	7	+2	10	Advance to knockout phase
3	(Romania) CFR Cluj	6	1	2	3	4	10	−6	5 (Note: Head-to-head points: CFR Cluj 4, CSKA Sofia 1.)	
4	(Bulgaria) CSKA Sofia	6	1	2	3	3	7	−4	5	

Source: UEFA
Rules for classification: Group stage tiebreakers

== 2021–22 UEFA Europa Conference League ==
=== Second qualifying round ===
22 July 2021
20:00

CSKA Sofia (Bulgaria)	0–0	(Latvia) Liepāja
	Report

Balgarska Armia Stadium, Sofia
Attendance: 2,600
Referee: Peter Bankes (England)
29 July 2021
20:00

Liepāja (Latvia)	0−0	(Bulgaria) CSKA Sofia
	Report
Penalties
Simić (penalty scored); Tkachuk (penalty missed); Šabala (penalty missed); Keita (penalty missed)	1−3	(penalty scored) Carey; (penalty scored) Caicedo; (penalty missed) Ahmedov; (penalty scored) Geferson

Daugavas stadions, Liepāja, Latvia
Attendance: 453
Referee: Marcel Bîrsan (Romania)

0–0 on aggregate. CSKA won 3−1 on penalty shootout.

=== Third qualifying round ===
5 August 2021
20:00

CSKA Sofia (Bulgaria)	4–2	(Croatia) Osijek
Mazikou 30'; Carey 39'; Caicedo 42'; Yomov 74'	Report	Mattheij 41' (o.g.); Topčagić 90+3'

Vasil Levski National Stadium, Sofia
Attendance: 4,494
Referee: Donatas Rumšas (Lithuania)
12 August 2021
20:00 EEST

Osijek (Croatia)	1−1	(Bulgaria) CSKA Sofia
Škorić 45'; Lončar (red card) 86'	Report	Carey 33'

Gradski Vrt Stadium, Osijek, Croatia
Attendance: 3,706
Referee: Don Robertson (Scotland)

CSKA Sofia won 5–3 on aggregate.

=== Play-off round ===
19 August 2021
20:00

Viktoria Plzeň (Czech Republic)	2–0	(Bulgaria) CSKA Sofia
Havel 10'; Mosquera 72'	Report

Doosan Arena, Plzeň, Czech Republic
Attendance: 6,859
Referee: Tiago Martins (Portugal)
26 August 2021
20:00 EEST

CSKA Sofia (Bulgaria)	3−0	(Czech Republic) Viktoria Plzeň
Carey 6'; Yomov 63'; Caicedo (yellow card) 67' (yellow-red card) 111'; Mattheij 119'	Report

Natsionalen stadion Vasil Levski, Sofia
Attendance: 6,717
Referee: Ali Palabıyık (Turkey)

CSKA Sofia won 3–2 on aggregate.

=== Group C ===
16 September 2021
21:00

Roma (Italy)	5–1	(Bulgaria) CSKA Sofia
Pellegrini 25', 62'; El Shaarawy 38'; Mancini 82'; Abraham 84'	Report	Carey 10'

Stadio Olimpico, Rome, Italy
Attendance: 29,876
Referee: Glenn Nyberg (Sweden)
30 September 2021
18:45 (19:45 EEST)

CSKA Sofia (Bulgaria)	0–0	(Norway) Bodø/Glimt
	Report

Natsionalen stadion Vasil Levski, Sofia
Attendance: 7,291
Referee: Aleksandrs Anufrijevs (Latvia)
21 October 2021
21:00 (22:00 EEST)

CSKA Sofia (Bulgaria)	0–1	(Ukraine) Zorya Luhansk
	Report	Sayyadmanesh 65'

Natsionalen stadion Vasil Levski, Sofia
Attendance: 3,158
Referee: Manuel Schüttengruber (Austria)
4 November 2021
18:45 (19:45 EET)

Zorya Luhansk (Ukraine)	2–0	(Bulgaria) CSKA Sofia
Zahedi 87'; Sayyadmanesh 90+5'	Report

Slavutych-Arena, Zaporizhzhia, Ukraine (Note: Zorya Luhansk play their home matches at Slavutych-Arena, Zaporizhzhia, instead of their regular stadium Avanhard Stadium, Luhansk, due to the war conditions in Eastern Ukraine.)
Attendance: 1,122
Referee: Petri Viljanen (Finland)
25 November 2021
21:00 (22:00 EET)

Bodø/Glimt (Norway)	2–0	(Bulgaria) CSKA Sofia
Brunstad Fet 25'; Botheim 85'	Report

Aspmyra Stadion, Bodø, Norway
Attendance: 5,339
Referee: Yigal Frid (Israel)
9 December 2021
18:45 (19:45 EET)

CSKA Sofia (Bulgaria)	2–3	(Italy) Roma
Čataković 75'; Wildschut 90+3'	Report	Abraham 15'; Mayoral 34'; Abraham 53'

Natsionalen stadion Vasil Levski, Sofia
Attendance: 4,640
Referee: Nick Walsh (Scotland)

Pos	Team	Pld	W	D	L	GF	GA	GD	Pts	Qualification
1	(Italy) Roma	6	4	1	1	18	11	+7	13	Advance to round of 16
2	(Norway) Bodø/Glimt	6	3	3	0	14	5	+9	12	Advance to knockout round play-offs
3	(Ukraine) Zorya Luhansk	6	2	1	3	5	11	−6	7	
4	(Bulgaria) CSKA Sofia	6	0	1	5	3	13	−10	1	

Source: UEFA
Rules for classification: Group stage tiebreakers

== 2022–23 UEFA Europa Conference League ==
=== Second qualifying round ===
21 July 2022
18:00

Makedonija GP (North Macedonia)	0–0	(Bulgaria) CSKA Sofia
	Report

Petar Miloševski Training Centre, Skopje, North Macedonia
Attendance: 402
Referee: Bram Van Driessche (Belgium)
28 July 2022
20:00

CSKA Sofia (Bulgaria)	4−0	(North Macedonia) Makedonija GP
Mattheij 31'; Yomov 61'; Tufegdžić 78'; Nazon 87'	Report

Stadion Balgarska Armia, Sofia, Bulgaria
Attendance: 4,697
Referee: Marcel Birsan (Romania)

CSKA Sofia won 4–0 on aggregate.

=== Third qualifying round ===
4 August 2022
20:00

CSKA Sofia (Bulgaria)	0–1	(Republic of Ireland) St Patrick's Athletic
	Report	Atakayi 87'

Natsionalen stadion Vasil Levski, Sofia
Attendance: 7,048
Referee: Manuel Schüttengruber (Austria)
11 August 2022
21:45

St Patrick's Athletic (Republic of Ireland)	0–2	(Bulgaria) CSKA Sofia
	Report	Garcez 12'; Turitsov 81' (pen.)

Tallaght Stadium, Dublin
Attendance: 6,760
Referee: Horațiu Feșnic (Romania)

CSKA Sofia won 2–1 on aggregate.

=== Play-off round ===
18 August 2022
20:00

CSKA Sofia (Bulgaria)	1−0	(Switzerland) Basel
López 70' (o.g.)	Report

Vasil Levski National Stadium, Sofia, Bulgaria
Attendance: 15,364
Referee: Duje Strukan (Croatia)
18 August 2022
20:00 EEST

Basel (Switzerland)	2−0	(Bulgaria) CSKA Sofia
F. Frei 66'; Lang 84'	Report

St. Jakob-Park, Basel, Switzerland
Attendance: 18,469
Referee: António Nobre (Portugal)

Basel won 2–1 on aggregate.

== 2023–24 UEFA Europa Conference League ==
=== Second qualifying round ===
27 July 2023
19:00 (20:00 EEST)

CSKA Sofia (Bulgaria)	0–2	(Romania) Sepsi OSK
	Report	Păun 68'; Varga 81'

Stadion Balgarska Armia, Sofia
Attendance: 7,966
Referee: Jochem Kamphuis (Netherlands)
3 August 2023
19:00 (20:00 EEST)

Sepsi OSK (Romania)	4–0	(Bulgaria) CSKA Sofia
Matei 19' (pen.); Aganović 70'; Varga 90'; Alimi 90+5' (pen.)	Report

Sepsi Arena Stadium, Sfântu Gheorghe
Attendance: 8,270
Referee: Eldorjan Hamiti (Albania)

Sepsi OSK won 6–0 on aggregate.

== 2026–27 UEFA Europa League ==
=== First qualifying round ===
9 July 2026
20:00 (21:00 UTC+3)

CSKA Sofia (Bulgaria)	3–2	(Republic of Ireland) Derry City
Pittas 20', 53'; Jordão 42'	Report	Boyce 31'; Olayinka 89'

Vasil Levski National Stadium, Sofia
Attendance: 12,713
Referee: Visar Kastrati (Kosovo)
16 July 2026
19:30 (18:30 UTC+1)

Derry City (Republic of Ireland)	1–2	(Bulgaria) CSKA Sofia
Chapman 47'	Report	Pittas 76'; Cotter 90+18' (o.g.)

Ryan McBride Brandywell Stadium, Derry
Attendance: 4,155
Referee: Jasmin Sabotic (Luxembourg)

CSKA Sofia won 5–3 on aggregate.

=== Second qualifying round ===
23 July 2026
18:00 (20:00 UTC+4)

Qarabağ (Azerbaijan)	0–0	(Bulgaria) CSKA Sofia
	Report

Tofiq Bahramov Republican Stadium, Baku
Attendance: 23,813
Referee: Daniele Chiffi (Italy)
30 July 2026
20:00 (21:00 UTC+3)

CSKA Sofia (Bulgaria)	0–0 (a.e.t.)	(Azerbaijan) Qarabağ
	Report
Penalties
Pittas (penalty scored); T. Ivanov (penalty scored); Gbamin (penalty scored); Sensi (penalty scored); Eto'o (penalty scored)	5–4	(penalty scored) Janković; (penalty missed) Silva; (penalty scored) Mouaddib; (penalty scored) Cephas; (penalty scored) Montiel

Vasil Levski National Stadium, Sofia
Attendance: 16,172
Referee: Bram Van Driessche (Belgium)

0–0 on aggregate. CSKA won 5−4 on penalty shootout.

=== Third qualifying round ===
6 August 2026
18:00 (20:00 UTC+4)

Maccabi Tel Aviv (Israel)	0–3	(Bulgaria) CSKA Sofia
	Report	Ebong 9'; Godoy 29'; Zwarts 90'

Adjarabet Arena, Batumi, Georgia
Attendance: 119
Referee: Manfredas Lukjančukas (Lithuania)
13 August 2026
20:00 (21:00 UTC+3)

CSKA Sofia (Bulgaria)	1–3	(Israel) Maccabi Tel Aviv
Sensi 66'	Report	Peretz 12'; Sokler 61'; Hélio Varela 69'

Vasil Levski National Stadium, Sofia
Attendance: 23,653
Referee: Daniel Schlager (Germany)

CSKA Sofia won 4–3 on aggregate.
