= Stefanov =

Stefanov (feminine Stefanova), (Bulgarian: Стефанов), also Stefanoff, is a patronymic Slavic surname. Notable people with this surname include:

- Antoaneta Stefanova, a Bulgarian chess grandmaster
- Boris Stefanov, also known as Boris Ştefanov, a Romanian communist politician
- Boris Stefanov (equestrian)
- Georgi Stefanov
- Gligor Stefanov, a sculptor and environmental installations artist who lives in Canada
- Iliyan Stefanov
- István Stefanov
- Khristo Stefanov
- Krasimir Stefanov
- Ljubomir Stefanov
- Metodiy Stefanov
- Mladen Stefanov
- Nikoleta Stefanova, a Bulgarian-born Italian table tennis player
- Nadja Stefanoff (born 1983), a German soprano
- Petar Stefanov
- Riste Stefanov, a Macedonian professional basketball player
- Roman Stefanov
- Stoyan Stefanov
- Tanya Stefanova, a female pole vaulter from Bulgaria
- Vrbica Stefanov, a former Yugoslav and Macedonian professional basketball player
- Parik Stefanov, a Romanian chess international master.
- Zhelyu Stefanov

== See also ==
- Kotoōshū Katsunori, born as Kaloyan Stefanov Mahlyanov
