= Krister Ericsson =

Swedish footballer

Personal information
- Date of birth: 25 September 1965 (age 61)
- Position: Midfielder

Senior career*
Years	Team	Apps	(Gls)
–1984	Nyköpings BIS		
1985–1988	IFK Norrköping		
1989–1993	Degerfors IF		
- * Club domestic league appearances and goals

Krister Ericsson (born 25 September 1965) is a Swedish retired football midfielder.
