= Dan Fröberg =

Swedish footballer

Personal information
- Date of birth: 13 August 1964 (age 62)
- Position: Forward

Senior career*
Years	Team	Apps	(Gls)
1981–1986	Degerfors IF		
1987–1988	IFK Göteborg		
1989–1990	Karlstad BK		
1991–1994	Degerfors IF		
- * Club domestic league appearances and goals

Dan Fröberg (born 13 August 1964) is a Swedish retired football striker.
