= Roman Stefanov =

Russian footballer

Personal information
- Full name: Roman Alekseyevich Stefanov
- Date of birth: 9 March 1978 (age 48)
- Height: 1.83 m (6 ft 0 in)
- Position: Defender

Youth career
- 1994–1995: Mashinostroitel Pskov
- 1996: Fakel Voronezh
- 1997–1998: CSK VVS-Kristall Smolensk

Senior career*
Years	Team	Apps	(Gls)
1994	Mashinostroitel Pskov	3	(0)
1999	Dynamo Bryansk	0	(0)
2000	Naftan-Devon Novopolotsk	2	(0)
2001	BSK Spirovo		
2002	Volga Tver		
2003	Dynamo Stavropol	3	(0)
2004	Darida Minsk Raion	29	(1)
2005	Magnit Zheleznogorsk	6	(0)
2006	Lokomotiv Vitebsk	16	(0)
2007	Darida Minsk Raion	10	(0)
2008–2009	Dmitrov	60	(2)
2010–2011	Dynamo Kostroma	28	(0)
2012–2013	Baikal Irkutsk	27	(2)
2013	Belogorsk		
- * Club domestic league appearances and goals

Roman Alekseyevich Stefanov (Russian: Роман Алексеевич Стефанов; born 9 March 1978) is a former Russian professional footballer.
