= Henrik Berger =

Swedish footballer

Personal information
- Date of birth: 16 May 1969 (age 57)
- Position: Midfielder

Senior career*
Years	Team	Apps	(Gls)
1987–1996	Degerfors IF		
1997	Molde FK	0	(0)
1997	IK Brage		
1998–1999	KB Karlskoga		
2000–2007	Degerfors IF		
- * Club domestic league appearances and goals

Henrik Berger (born 16 May 1969) is a Swedish retired football midfielder.
