= Ulf Ottosson =

Swedish footballer

Personal information
- Full name: Ulf Peter Ottosson
- Date of birth: 2 July 1968 (age 58)
- Place of birth: Degerfors, Sweden
- Height: 1.83 m (6 ft 0 in)
- Position: Striker

Senior career*
Years	Team	Apps	(Gls)
1987–1996	Degerfors IF	196	(121)
1992	→ FC Locarno (loan)		
1996	Chaves	11	(0)
1996–1997	IFK Norrköping	7	(0)
1997	→ Norwich City (loan)	7	(1)
1997	Ljungskile SK	12	(2)
1997–1999	Degerfors IF		
2000	Viterbese		
2000–2004	Degerfors IF	20	(9)
2006	Strömtorps IK	4	(5)
2011–2013	Ängebäck BK	24	(8)
2018	Gullspångs IF	5	(1)

Managerial career
- 2005: Gullspångs IF
- 2007: Strömtorps IK
- 2011–2012: Ängebäck BK
- * Club domestic league appearances and goals

Ulf Peter "Mål-Otto" Ottosson (born 2 July 1968) is a Swedish former professional footballer who played as a striker. He has also coached various teams in Sweden. He is Degerfors IF's top goal scorer of all time with 205 goals.

== Playing career ==
Nicknamed "Mål-Otto" ("Goal-Otto"), Ottosson spent most of his playing career at Degerfors IF, having three different spells at the club in total. He had a brief spell in England on loan with Division One side Norwich City in 1997, scoring one goal in a 3–2 win away at Sheffield United. Manager Mike Walker decided against offering him a full-time contract, resulting in Ottoson's return to Sweden. He holds the record of scoring the most goals for Degerfors IF in their club history, a total of 205 goals.

At the end of his second spell with Degerfors, Ottosson was said to have started his own business making cabinets.

== Coaching career ==
Ottosson began coaching at Gullspångs IF in 2005, before taking up a player role Strömtorps IK in 2006. The following year, he became coach of Strömtorps, but was fired in September 2007 following a 2–0 loss against Kungsör BK. After taking a three-year-long timeout from football, Ottosson returned as a player-manager for Swedish 7th level club Ängebäck BK in 2011 but quit halfway through the 2013 season.
