= Greg Costello =

Irish former footballer

Personal information
- Full name: Greg Costello
- Date of birth: 5 April 1970 (age 56)
- Place of birth: Dublin, Ireland
- Position: Midfielder

Youth career
- 1985–1990: Queens Park Rangers F.C. Swindon Town 1990

Senior career*
Years	Team	Apps	(Gls)
1991–2000	Shelbourne	300+	(30+)
2000–2001	Athlone Town	19	(1)
2000–2001	Kilkenny City	12	(0)
2001–2003	Shamrock Rovers	42	(0)

International career
1985–1988	Republic of Ireland U18	21	(0)
1996	League of Ireland XI	1	(0)
- * Club domestic league appearances and goals

Greg Costello (born 5 April 1970 in Dublin) is an Irish former footballer.

A full back Greg made his League of Ireland debut for Shelbourne at home to St Pat's on 11 January 1991. He scored the winner for Shels in the 1993 FAI Cup Final at Lansdowne Road.

Costello scored in a UEFA Cup Winners' Cup win in September 1993.

He joined Shamrock Rovers in 2001 where he made 2 appearances in European competition, after spells at Kilkenny City and Athlone Town.

== Honours ==
- League of Ireland: 1
  - Shelbourne 1991/92
- FAI Cup: 3
  - Shelbourne 1993, 1996, 1997
