= Adam Kucz =

Polish footballer

Personal information
- Date of birth: 16 June 1971 (age 55)
- Place of birth: Tychy, Poland
- Height: 1.65 m (5 ft 5 in)
- Position: Midfielder

Youth career
- Kolejarz 24 Katowice
- GKS Katowice

Senior career*
Years	Team	Apps	(Gls)
1989–1991	Górnik Katowice		
1991–1992	Zagłębie Sosnowiec	34	(4)
1992–1999	GKS Katowice	194	(21)
1999	Odra Wodzisław	9	(0)
2000	SV 07 Elversberg	6	(1)
2000	Lech Poznań		
2001–2002	ŁKS Łódź		
2002–2003	Rozwój Katowice		
2003–2005	Kolejarz Stróże		
2005	Polonia Łaziska Górne		
2006	Kolejarz Stróże		
2006	LKS Jodłownik		
2007	Skałka Żabnica		
2008	Górnik 09 Mysłowice		
2008–2009	Fortuna Gliwice		
2009	AKS Mikołów		
2010	Sokół Zabrzeg		
2010	Warta Kamieńskie Młyny		
2011–2014	Fortuna Gliwice		
2015	Pionier Ujejsce		
- * Club domestic league appearances and goals

Adam Kucz (born 16 June 1971) is a Polish former professional footballer who played as a midfielder.

== Honours ==
GKS Katowice

- Polish Cup: 1992–93
- Polish Super Cup: 1995
