= Vanyo Shishkov =

Bulgarian footballer

Personal information
- Date of birth: 6 May 1969 (age 57)
- Place of birth: Stara Zagora, Bulgaria
- Height: 1.87 m (6 ft 2 in)
- Position: Forward

Senior career*
Years	Team	Apps	(Gls)
1987–1992	Beroe	94	(20)
1992–1994	CSKA Sofia	40	(11)
1994	Beroe	8	(1)
1994	CSKA Sofia	12	(2)
1995	Beroe	15	(4)
1995	Slavia Sofia	6	(0)
1996	Rakovski Ruse	14	(5)
1996–1998	Dobrudzha Dobrich	46	(11)
1998	Espérance	7	(2)
1998	Belasitsa Petrich	14	(4)
1999	Akademik Sofia	10	(1)
1999	Olympik-Beroe	1	(0)
2000–2002	Beroe	33	(6)
2002	Nafpaktiakos Asteras	11	(2)
2003	Olympik Teteven	14	(3)
- * Club domestic league appearances and goals

Vanyo Shishkov (Bulgarian: Ваньо Шишков) (born 6 May 1969) is a former Bulgarian footballer.

== Career ==
Born in Stara Zagora, Shishkov spent the majority of his playing days in the top flight of Bulgarian football, with his career being associated most notably with Beroe in the late 1980s and early 1990s as well as with Bulgarian powerhouse CSKA Sofia between 1992 and 1994. He played 8 matches for the "armymen" in European tournaments, scoring 6 goals in the process. During the later stages of his footballing career, Shishkov also had short spells in Tunisia (winning the national league with Espérance) and Greece. Following his retirement from the game of football, Shishkov switched to police work.
