= Ivan Pavlov (footballer) =

Bulgarian footballer

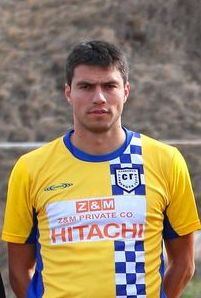

Personal information
- Date of birth: 18 August 1983 (age 43)
- Place of birth: Sofia, Bulgaria
- Height: 1.83 m (6 ft 0 in)
- Position: Midfielder

Team information
- Current team: Slivnishki geroi
- Number: 25

Senior career*
Years	Team	Apps	(Gls)
2002–2003	CSKA Sofia	1	(0)
2003–2004	Spartak Varna	22	(2)
2004–2005	Rodopa Smolyan	2	(0)
2005–2006	Pirin Blagoevgrad	22	(2)
2006–2007	Lokomotiv Sofia	6	(0)
2007–2008	Lokomotiv Mezdra		
2008–2009	Sportist Svoge		
2009	Spartak Varna		
2010–2011	Dorostol Silistra	16	(0)
2011–2012	Slivnishki geroi	8	(1)
2012–2013	FC Germania Friedrichsfeld		
2013–	TSV Neckarau		
- * Club domestic league appearances and goals

Ivan Pavlov (Bulgarian: Иван Павлов, born 18 August 1983) is a Bulgarian football player currently playing for Slivnishki geroi as a midfielder.

== Awards ==
- Champion of Bulgaria: 2003 (with CSKA Sofia)
