= Kaliakra Kavarna Albena Cup =

- Founded: 2000
- Region: Bulgaria (UEFA)
- Teams: 4-15
- Current champions: (Bulgaria) PFC Sportist Svoge
- Most championships: (Bulgaria) PFC Levski Sofia (3 titles)

Kaliakra Kavarna Albena Cup (Bulgarian: Калиакра Каварна Албена Къп) or Albena Cup (Bulgarian: Албена Къп) is an annual summer international football tournament held in Albena, Bulgaria, since 2000. Sponsored is "Moto-Pphoe", PFL, Bulgarian Football Union, municipality of Kavarna and resort "Albena" at home. Media Partner of the event's newspaper "Topsport". Chief organizer Nikolay Zlatev, who is head of the "Sport" in resort "Albena" AD. Kaliakra Kavarna Albena Cup is a descendant of the traditional international tournament Albena MobilTel (2001-2003). It is held in January and February.

In the first edition of the tournament eight participating teams were divided into two groups of four teams. Played against each other, arguing the winners for first place, while others allocate places to 8th.

== Finals ==
Year	Champion	Runners-up	Third place	Fourth place
2000	(Bulgaria) PFC Levski Sofia	(Russia) FC Krylia Sovetov Samara	(Bulgaria) PFC Spartak Varna	(Georgia (country)) FC Torpedo Kutaisi
2001	(Bulgaria) PFC Levski Sofia	(Croatia) NK Osijek	(Russia) FC Krylia Sovetov Samara	(Slovakia) MFK Ružomberok
2002	(Bulgaria) PFC Levski Sofia	(Bulgaria) PFC Slavia Sofia	(Poland) Orlen Płock	(Romania) FC Dinamo București
2003	(Serbia and Montenegro) FK Železnik	(Bulgaria) PFC Slavia Sofia	(Bulgaria) PFC Levski Sofia	(Ukraine) FC Stal Alchevsk
2004	(Bulgaria) PFC Lokomotiv Plovdiv	(Bulgaria) FC Shumen	(Bulgaria) PFC Levski Sofia	(Bulgaria) PFC Spartak Varna
2005	The tournament was abandoned due to bad weather			
2006	(Kazakhstan) FC Kairat	(Bulgaria) PFC Cherno More Varna	(Bulgaria) PFC Koneliano German	(Bulgaria) PFC Dobrudzha Dobrich
2007	(Bulgaria) PFC Lokomotiv Plovdiv	(Bulgaria) PFC Spartak Varna	(Bulgaria) FC Shumen	(Serbia) FK Radnički Niš
2008	(Bulgaria) PFC Spartak Varna	(Bulgaria) PFC Kaliakra Kavarna	(Bulgaria) PFC Lokomotiv Mezdra	-
2009	(Bulgaria) PFC CSKA Sofia	(Bulgaria) PFC Cherno More Varna	(Bulgaria) PFC Beroe Stara Zagora	(Bulgaria) PFC Montana
2010	(Bulgaria) PFC Lokomotiv Mezdra	(Bulgaria) PFC Beroe Stara Zagora	(Bulgaria) PFC Montana	-
2011	(Bulgaria) PFC Kaliakra Kavarna	(Bulgaria) PFC Svetkavitsa	(Bulgaria) PFC Sportist Svoge	(Bulgaria) FC Dorostol 2003
2012	(Bulgaria) PFC Sportist Svoge	(Bulgaria) PFC Dobrudzha Dobrich	(Bulgaria) PFC Svetkavitsa	(Bulgaria) PFC Kaliakra Kavarna
2013	The tournament was abandoned			
2014	(Bulgaria) POFC Rakovski 2011	(Bulgaria) PFC Kaliakra Kavarna	(Bulgaria) PFC Spartak Varna	(Armenia) FC Ararat Yerevan
2015				
