= Sector G =

Football stadium section in Sofia, Bulgaria

- Sector G at Vasil Levski National Stadium
- Nickname: Армейци (Army men)
- Type: Supporters, Ultras group
- Stand: North
- Motto: Sector G - that's you!
- Teams: CSKA Sofia
- Arenas: Balgarska Armia Stadium; Vasil Levski National Stadium; Armeets Arena
- Website: Fan Club Sector G
- Founded: 1990
- Colors: Red & White

Sector G (Bulgarian: Сектор Г) is a section of Balgarska Armia Stadium which is closely associated with the ultras of Bulgarian football team CSKA Sofia.

Sector G mostly supports the football club of the CSKA Sofia sports society but also visits the important games of the volleyball, hockey and basketball departments of CSKA. The most influential ultras groups in Sector G are Animals and Offenders. Members of Sector G often have nationalistic, antiziganistic, albanophobic and turkophobic beliefs.

Sector G traditionally maintains good relations with the supporters of Romanian football club CSA Steaua București, Partizan Belgrade, CSKA Moscow, Rot-Weiss Erfrut, AC Milan and Liverpool. Sector G's main rivalries are with Levski Sofia's Sector B and Lauta Army of Lokomotiv Plovdiv.

== History ==
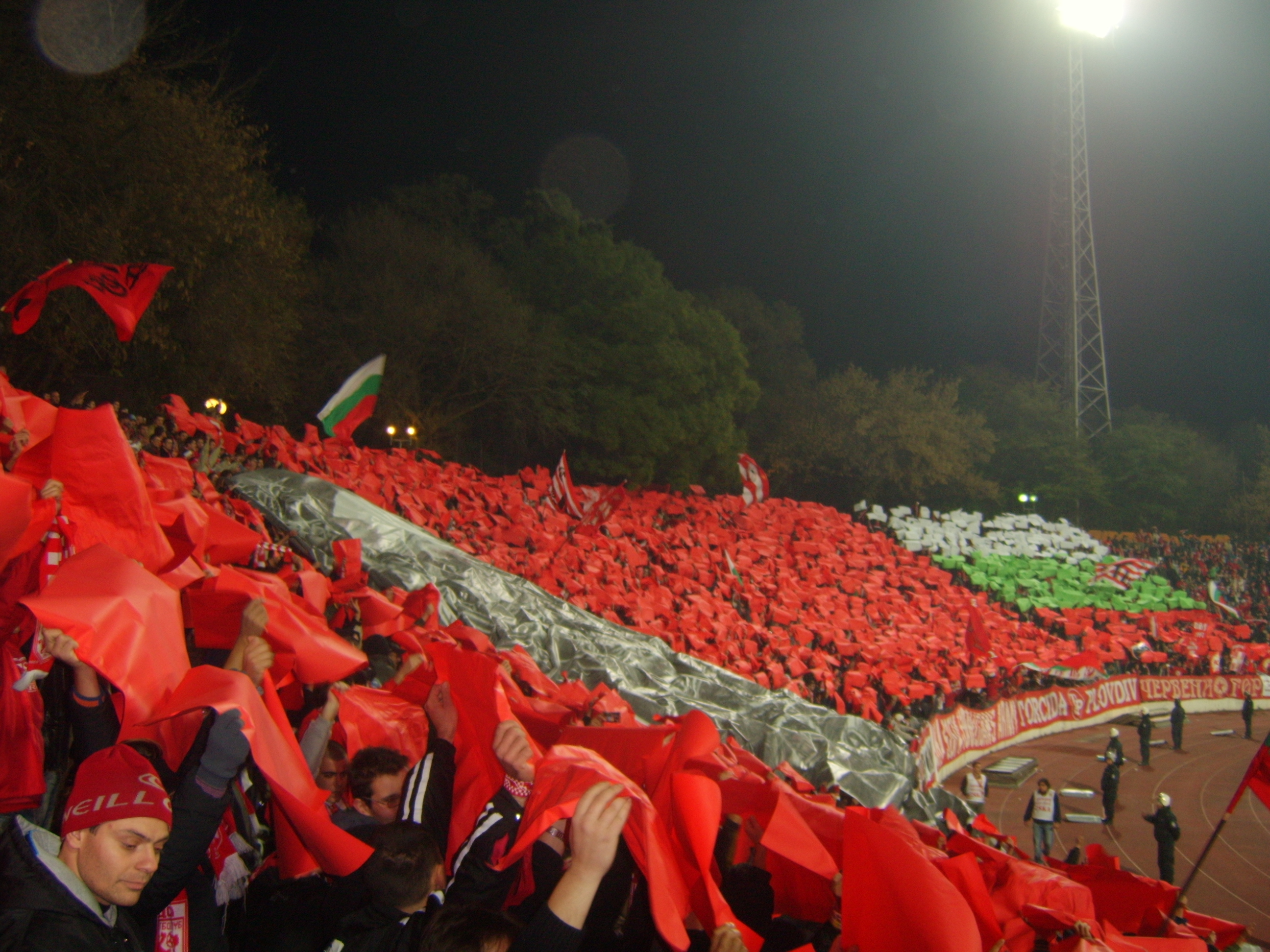
Sector G at Balgarska Armia Stadium

Although it was created relatively later than the other popular Bulgarian clubs, the team's early success led to a quickly growing fanbase and by the 1960s it already was one of the most popular and successful Bulgarian clubs at the time.

The club's record attendance dates back to 1982. Some 70,000 spectators attended the European Champions Cup quarter final and semifinal games against Liverpool F.C. and Bayern Munich at Vasil Levski National Stadium, which are one of the largest recorded attendances of sport events in Bulgaria.

In October 1999, Dimitar Angelov was appointed as a chairman of the National Fan Club of CSKA and left in August 2012.

=== 2008 protests ===
After CSKA won the 2007-08 A PFG without a single loss and with a record advantage of 16 points ahead of second-placed Levski Sofia, the team's license for European competitions was taken away because of financial problems. This resulted in several protests against the club's then-president Aleksandar Tomov, some of which ended with minor clashes with the police. In the end of the year, Tomov sold the club to Dimitar Borisov and Ivo Ivanov.

=== Boycott and 2011 split ===
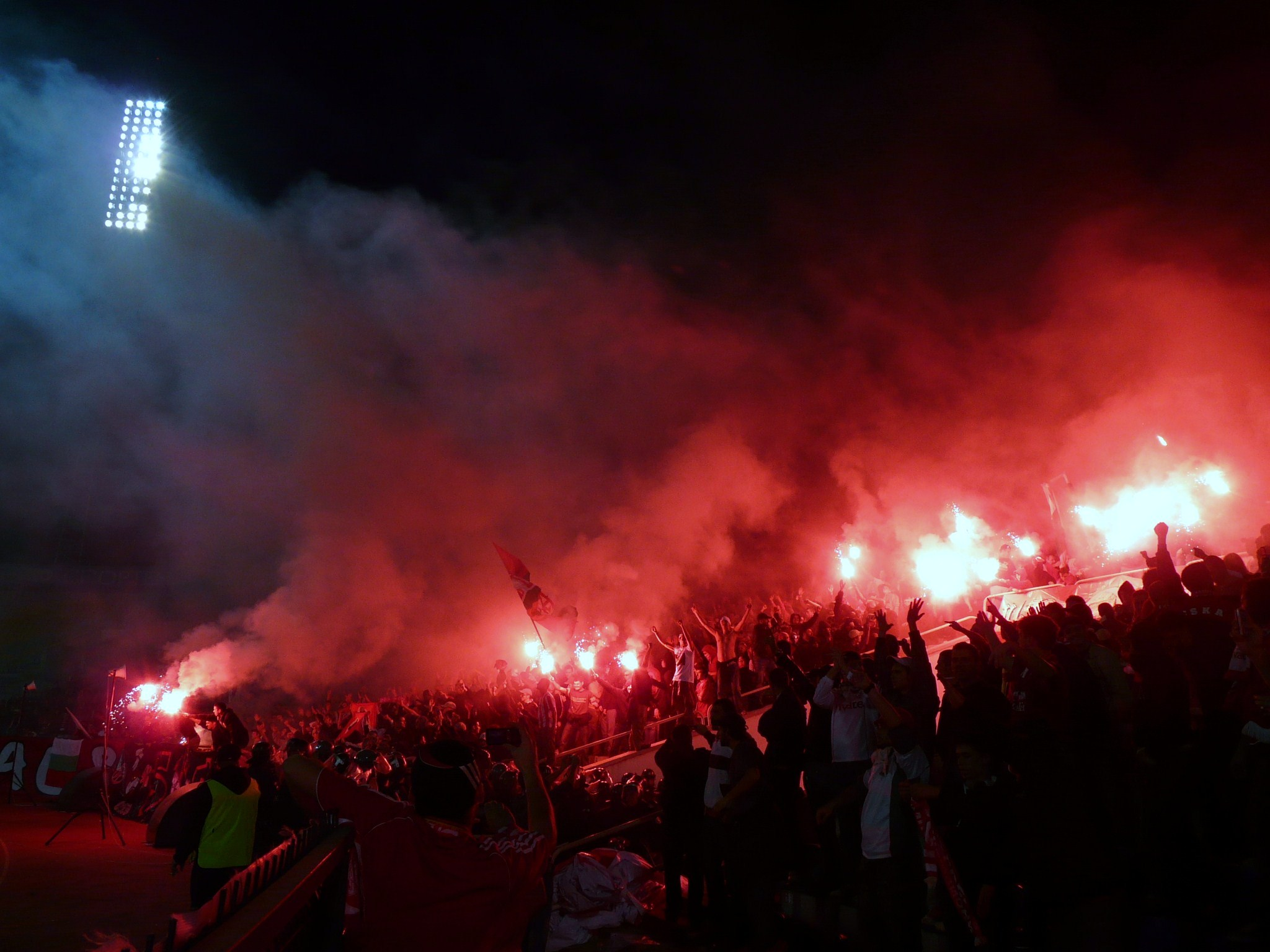
CSKA ultras at Vasil Levski National Stadium.

After numerous head coach changes, unfulfilled project for a new stadium and poor performance of the team, the majority of the ultras declared a boycott of the club's domestic home games because of inadequate management of the team by its new owners. After CSKA lost 0:2 to Rapid Vienna in Sofia during the 2010-11 Europa League group stage, thousands of fans gathered in front of the stadium shortly after the game seeking response from the owners, who were believed to be the main reason for the team's poor performance. However, the police pushed out the fans from the stadium and clashed with them.

In 2011, the boycott was stopped and protests continued on the stadium. The protests were not fully supported by Dimitar Angelov and the National Fan Club which led to tensions inside Sector G. Shortly after, it became known that Angelov was receiving money from the owners which he allegedly used for private purposes. As a result, Angelov's supporters rapidly decreased and he quickly lost his power and influence. The ultras group Ofanziva was founded by Angelov's antagonists and it is currently the most influential and largest group inside Sector G.

After CSKA unexpectedly lost to the Slovenian club ND Mura 05 in the second qualifying round of the 2012/13 Europa League, tensions between the fans and the club's board escalated once again. Thus, a large protest against the club's owners was proposed for 26 August 2012.

=== 2013 protests and victory of fans against owners from Titan AS ===
After the uncertain future ahead of CSKA Sofia, all united fan clubs announced national protests against the rule of the "Pernik garbages" (fans called them, because of their business with waste disposal and because they were born in the town of Pernik).

After several daily protests, on 29 June 2013 Bulgarian Football Union announced that CSKA will not get a license for next season and the club will be closed, affected of this over 1000 supporters go to the central office of Titan AS (owners of CSKA), but were stopped by police, they come back and go to the BFU headquarters and attack building with stones, firecrackers, flares, smoke bombs and anything that's handy on the street.

About two weeks later the club is sold to Red Champions Group, association of businessmen and sports figures attached to CSKA Sofia.
