= PFC CSKA Sofia =

Bulgarian association football club from Sofia

CSKA Sofia
- Full name: Professional Football Club CSKA Sofia
- Nicknames: The Аrmy Men; The Reds
- Short name: CSKA
- Founded: 5 May 1948; 78 years ago
- Ground: Stadion Balgarska Armia
- Capacity: 18,540
- Owner: Valter Papazki
- Head coach: Markus Gisdol
- League: First League
- 2025–26: First League, 4th of 16
- Website: cska.bg
Home colours	Away colours	Third colours

PFC CSKA Sofia (Bulgarian: ПФК ЦСКА София) is a Bulgarian professional association football club based in Sofia and currently competing in the country's premier football competition, the First League. CSKA is an abbreviation for Central Sports Club of the Army (Bulgarian: Централен Спортен Клуб на Армията).

Officially established on 5 May 1948, CSKA's roots date back to an army officers' club founded in 1923. The club has won a record 31 Bulgarian titles and 22 Bulgarian Cups. Internationally, CSKA are the only Bulgarian club to have reached the semi-finals of the European Cup, which they have done twice, and they have also reached the semi-final of the UEFA Cup Winners' Cup once.

CSKA's home colors are red and white and its home ground is the Stadion Balgarska Armia. The club's biggest rivals are Levski Sofia and matches between the two sides are known as The Eternal Derby.

== History ==
=== 1923–1948 ===
In November 1923, three Sofia-based football clubs (Officers' Sports Club, Athletic Sofia, and Slava Sofia) merged to form AS-23, short for Officers' Sports Club Athletic Slava 1923, under the patronage of the Ministry of War, which provided the equipment.

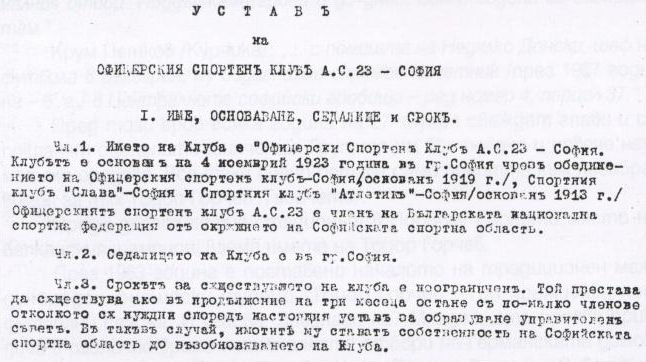
AS-23's founding charter (4 November 1923)

In 1931, AS-23 won their first Bulgarian championship and The Tsar's Cup, followed by another Tsar's Cup in 1941. The club's stadium (completed in 1938) was named Athletic Park and was situated where the Bulgarian Army Stadium now resides.

On 9 November 1944, with the support of Mihail Mihaylov, an accountant at the Ministry of War and a patron of Shipka Sofia, a unifying agreement was signed, merging AS-23, Shipka, and Spartak (Poduene) to form Chavdar Sofia. Gen. Vladimir Stoychev from AS-23, who at the time was fighting on the front in World War II, was appointed (by telegram) as the new club's chairman. Lawyer Ivan Bashev, a future Bulgarian foreign minister, was appointed club secretary and the person in charge of football.

=== 1948–1962 ===
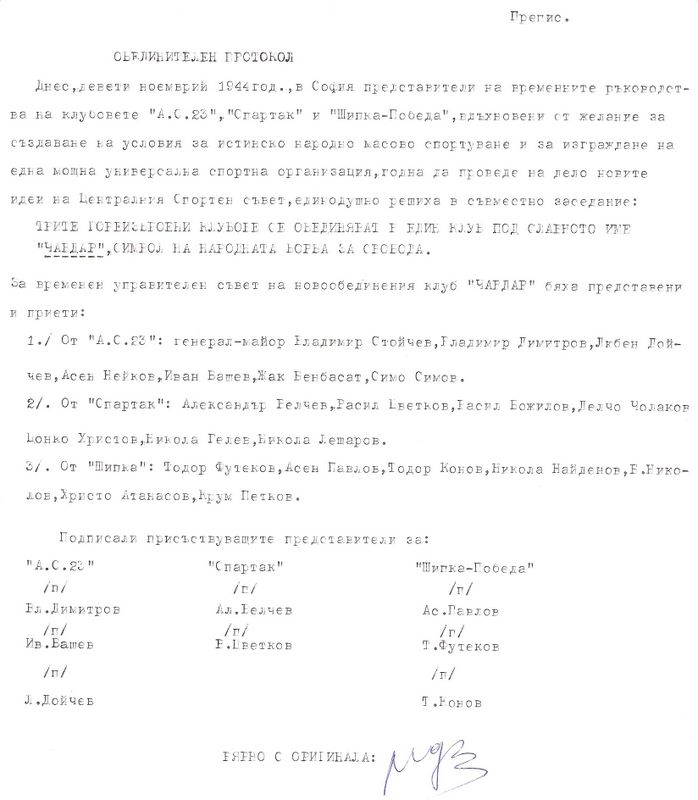
The unifying protocol of Chavdar Sofia (1944)

With the help of Mihail Mihaylov again, in February 1948, Chavdar became the departmental club of the Central House of the Troops ("Centralnia Dom na Voiskata") and took on the name of CDV. Looking for ways to stop the club's decline, CDV's administrators sought to merge it with another club. In May 1948, an agreement was reached between CDV and Septemvri Sofia (which had already earned a place in the play-offs) for uniting the clubs under the name "Septemvri pri CDV" (Septemvri at CDV). The contract was signed on 5 May 1948, which is officially considered the club's date of foundation.

The club's played its first official match on 19 May 1948 against Slavia Sofia at Yunak Stadium, a 1–1 draw. Septemvri pri CDV eliminated Aprilov (Gabrovo) and Spartak Varna en route to the final, where it faced Levski Sofia, losing 1–2 in the first leg. The decisive second match occurred on 9 September 1948. Septemvri pri CDV's lineup consisted of: Stefan Gerenski, Borislav Futekov, Manol Manolov, Dimitar Cvetkov, Nikola Aleksiev, Nako Chakmakov (captain), Dimitar Milanov, Stoyne Minev, Stefan Bozhkov, Nikola Bozhilov and Kiril Bogdanov. The score was 3–3 on aggregate, as Septemvri pri CDV led 2–1 near the end of regulation time, when a last-minute goal by Nako Chakmakov gave the club its first ever title.

A monument of the first captain of CSKA Sofia – Nako Chakmakov, in front of the newly renovated Stadion Balgarska Armia

In 1950, the word "Narodna" ("Peoples" in English) was added to the name of the Central House of the Troops, changing it to Central House of the People's Troops ("Centralen Dom na Narodnata Voiska" in English), or C.D.N.V., effectively changing the club's name. The following two years, C.D.N.V. won two consecutive titles. In 1951, the club clinched their first double. In 1953, the club was again renamed by the authorities, this time to Otbor na Sofiyskiya Garnizon ("Team of the Sofia Garrison"), and most of the key players were illegally transferred out. The title was lost.

The following year, the club was renamed CDNA (Central House of the People's Army), and the years between 1954 and 1962 marked one of the most successful periods for the Reds, who won nine consecutive titles (an unprecedented achievement in Bulgarian football at the time and a record the club held for 60 years) and, in 1956, took part in the second installment of the newly created European Cup competition, reaching the quarter-finals.

=== 1960s ===
In 1962, CDNA was merged with DSO Cherveno Zname to form CSKA Cherveno Zname ("CSKA Red Flag"). The Central House of the People's Troops ceased its affiliation with the club, which was taken over by the Ministry of People's Defense. CSKA finished third after Spartak Plovdiv and Botev Plovdiv in the 1962–63 season. The following season, CSKA had its worst performance in the Bulgarian championship to date, finishing 11th in the final table, only three points from relegation. This led to the sacking of legendary coach Krum Milev after 16 years at the helm.

CSKA did not recapture the title until 1966. However, during the 1966–67 season, CSKA recorded its first major international achievement, reaching the semi-finals of the European Cup for the first time, where they faced Italian giants Inter. After two hard-fought 1–1 draws, a third decisive match was played, which CSKA lost 0–1.

The next two seasons were unmemorable for the Army Men, finishing in fifth and second place respectively. In 1968, CSKA underwent another merger, joining with Septemvri Sofia and taking on the name of CSKA Septemvriysko Zname ("CSKA September Flag"). The club clinched the title in 1969 with the help of recent acquisition Petar Zhekov, who would go on to become the top Bulgarian goalscorer of all time, a record Zhekov held for 52 years until he was surpassed by Martin Kamburov in 2021.

=== 1970s ===
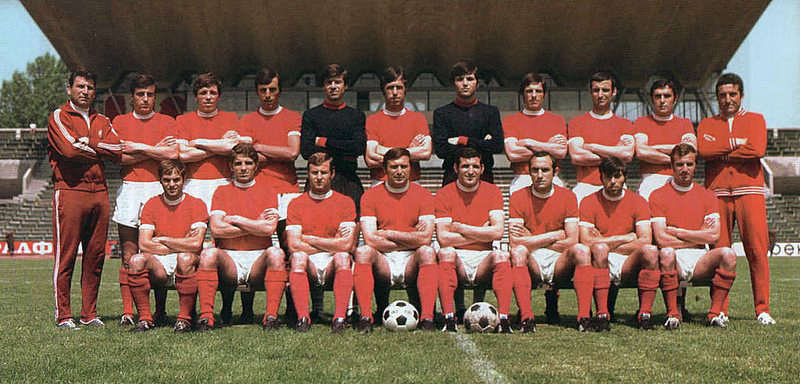
CSKA Sofia in 1973

The 1970s are widely considered the period when CSKA made its name on the European stage. The club began the decade modestly, claiming second place domestically and reaching the round of 16 in 1970–71 European Cup Winners' Cup, where they fell to English side Chelsea 0–2 on aggregate. However, from 1971 to 1973, CSKA won three consecutive titles and delivered one of the biggest surprises in European football when it eliminated reigning European champion Ajax – considered the finest team of all time – 2–1 on aggregate in the 1973–74 European Cup.

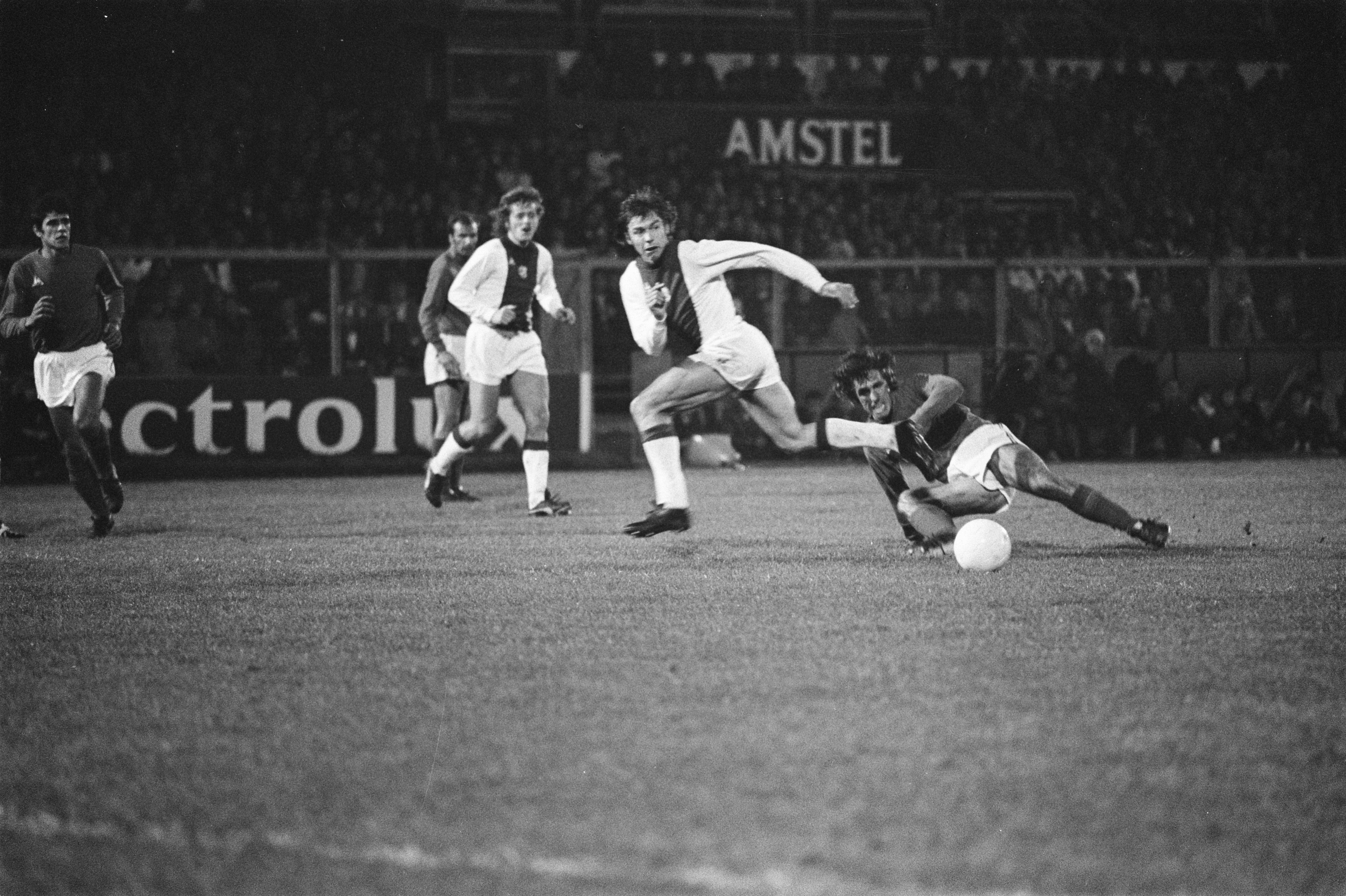
CSKA vs Ajax (October 1973)

They then faced German champions Bayern Munich in the quarter-finals. After losing 1–4 in the first leg in Munich, CSKA bowed out of the competition following a 2–1 win at home. Between 1975 and 1979, the club won two more domestic titles.

=== 1980s ===
The 1980–81 season was again a memorable one for CSKA Sofia, winning the Bulgarian title once more and twice beating European champion Nottingham Forest, both times with 1–0 scorelines, before being stopped by the future European champions Liverpool with a 6–1 defeat on aggregate in the quarter-finals of the European Cup.

The next season, CSKA reached their second-straight European Cup semi-final, eliminating Spanish champions Real Sociedad, Glentoran and Liverpool after losing 0–1 in England and winning 2–0 at home with two goals by Stoycho Mladenov. In the semi-final, the Reds again faced Bayern Munich. The first leg was held in Sofia and started with a full dominance over Bayern, as by the 16th minute, CSKA were leading 3–0 in front of 85,000 jubilant spectators who saw the European final in their dreams. But the final score was 4–3 for CSKA. In Munich, the club suffered a 4–0 defeat, ending what is still the deepest run by a Bulgarian side in the European Cup or UEFA Champions League.

In the domestic league, CSKA did not let go of the title until the 1984–85 season, where they finished second behind arch-rivals Levski, but still managed to reach the Bulgarian Cup final.

On 18 June 1985, the final for the Bulgarian Cup was held at the Vasil Levski National Stadium between CSKA and Levski Sofia. The match was marked by many questionable referee decisions and saw several brutal fights, including an assault on a referee by some of Levski's players. CSKA won the match 2–1, even though they had missed a penalty when the score was 2–0. By decree of the Central Committee of the Bulgarian Communist Party, both teams were disbanded and re-founded under new management. CSKA was renamed Sredets while Levski was renamed Vitosha. Several players were banned from participating in official matches for varying periods of time, including Hristo Stoichkov and Kostadin Yanchev from CSKA. One year later, the committee's decision was reversed and the players were reinstated.

As Sredets, the club finished in fourth place in the 1985–86 season. In 1987, the club was renamed CFKA Sredets ("Central Football Club of the Army Sredets"), and the following three years were marked by a formidable performance, even as Septemvri Sofia ended their 20-year partnership with CFKA in 1988 and became an independent club again. Coached by Dimitar Penev, CFKA won the title in 1987 and 1989 and reached the UEFA Cup Winners' Cup semi-finals against Barcelona in 1989. In reaching this stage in the tournament, CFKA had eliminated Roda JC after penalty kicks following a 2–1 win at home and a 1–2 loss away. Barcelona, coached by former Dutch international Johan Cruyff, won both matches (4–2 in Barcelona and 2–1 in Sofia) and CFKA were eliminated, but Cruyff did notice the talent of Hristo Stoichkov and decided to bring him to Barcelona the following year, effectively launching Stoichkov's international career.

=== 1990s ===
The decade, immediately following the fall of communism, brought turbulent changes to Bulgarian football, and the club was not spared. The CSKA name was restored starting with the 1989–90 season and they won the title again. In March 1991, former footballer and administrator Valentin Mihov was chosen as president of CSKA. The club bought some of the most talented Bulgarian players, including Yordan Letchkov, Ivaylo Andonov and Stoycho Stoilov, among others. Meanwhile, the Ministry of Defense concluded their affiliation with the club. Despite the uncertainty and the numerous problems that followed, CSKA won the title again in 1992. They were later eliminated in the first round of the 1992–93 UEFA Champions League by Austria Wien after losing 1–3 in Vienna and winning 3–2 in Sofia.

In the meantime, Valentin Mihov was appointed president of the Bulgarian Football Union and Petar Kalpakchiev was chosen as his replacement. However, Kalpakchiev wrangled with the club's administration over their decisions to replace several coaches, one of which was Gjoko Hadžievski, considered to be leading the club in the right direction, and eventually he was fired.

The owner of the Multigroup conglomerate, Iliya Pavlov, took over as president, but ultimately his sponsorship proved insufficient to overcome the club's ineffective management. Five coaches were changed in just one season, with Tsvetan Yonchev being coach for just one day. In Europe, CSKA nevertheless defeated Juventus 3–2 in the first round of the 1994–95 UEFA Cup, but the result was annulled by UEFA because of the delayed player-indexing of forward Petar Mihtarski, and Juventus were awarded a 3–0 victory by default. In the second leg in Turin, CSKA succumbed to a 5–1 defeat.

In the summer of 1995, CSKA made a strong selection and eventually the club included half of the youth national football team of Bulgaria. Plamen Markov was appointed head coach, but after a disappointing first half of the season, he was replaced by Georgi Vasilev, who had previously won three Bulgarian titles (one with Etar Veliko Tarnovo and two with Levski Sofia). Vasilev managed to win a double with CSKA for the 1996–97 season, entering the second qualifying round of the Champions League against Steaua București. After a dramatic 3–3 in Bucharest, CSKA fell 0–2 at home.

Vasilev was unexpectedly released from the club at the beginning of the second half of the 1997–98 season after a 3–0 win over Spartak Pleven. Coach Petar Zehtinski took his place. That year, the club saw the return of Hristo Stoichkov, Emil Kostadinov and Trifon Ivanov, but the three of them challenged each other for the captain's band. Stoichkov played in only four matches and left CSKA right before the derby with Levski to play for a club in Saudi Arabia. After the end of the season, Ivanov also left the club. CSKA finished in third place.

In the summer of 1998, Dimitar Penev took the lead as head coach for the second time. CSKA reached the second round of the UEFA Cup and won the Bulgarian Cup, but disappointed in the domestic league, finishing in fifth place in 1999. That season, the young talents of Martin Petrov, Stilian Petrov, Dimitar Berbatov and Vladimir Manchev started to play a bigger role in the team. There were problems with player-indexing due to some unpaid obligations to Neftochimik. In the domestic championship, CSKA had only 16 players registered for the 1999–2000 season and some un-indexed players took part in official UEFA games. Consequently, at the shareholders meeting at the end of 1999, the club ownership was transferred to businessman Vasil Bozhkov.

=== 2000s ===
After the first two fixtures in the spring of 2000, which the club lost, Dimitar Penev was relieved as coach and in his place was appointed Georgi Dimitrov – Jacky, who was later replaced by Spas Dzhevizov. After a 1–1 draw with Pirin at Bulgarian Army Stadium, Dzhevizov handed in his resignation and Aleksandar Stankov took his place. Even though at times CSKA had fallen as far as nine points behind league leaders Levski, the club shortened the difference to only two points before the decisive match for the title at Georgi Asparuhov Stadium. CSKA dominated Levski for most of the match, as Dimitar Berbatov made several serious misses, but a last-minute goal from Georgi Ivanov secured the title for Levski.

In the summer of 2000, the Italian Enrico Catuzzi was retained as head coach, who managed to revive the team. However, even though the Army Men played attractive matches under his leadership, Catuzzi resigned during the winter break, citing family problems. Aleksandar Stankov was appointed as coach again, but was replaced by Catuzzi again after two losses from Litex for the cup and the championship. The Reds finished second, seven points behind Levski.

To start the 2001–02 season, CSKA's head coach was Asparuh Nikodimov, who would be fired during the winter break, as CSKA was situated two points behind Levski. He was replaced by another Italian, Luigi Simoni. Simoni failed to make CSKA champions as the club finished third and lost the Bulgarian Cup final to Levski. Simoni left at the end of the season.

In the summer of 2002, former CSKA striker Stoycho Mladenov was appointed as head coach. With him, the team set a record of 13 consecutive wins in 13 matches and won the title for the first time since 1997. However, Mladenov was fired the following season after losing to Galatasaray in the qualifying rounds of the 2003–04 UEFA Champions League and after giving a less than impressive performance in the first round of the UEFA Cup, where the club lost on penalty kicks to Torpedo Moscow. Immediately after, two of the new arrivals, Léo Lima and Rodrigo Sousa, purchased for a total of 3 million dollars the year before, left the club on the grounds they had not received two monthly salaries. FIFA decided they had the right to leave and that CSKA had to pay them and release the players to their former club, Vasco da Gama. Alexander Stankov was temporarily appointed as head coach until the winter break, when Ferario Spasov officially took over. At the end of 2004, Spasov was replaced by Serbian coach Miodrag Ješić, despite the club's first place in the league. With Ješić at the helm, CSKA won their record 30th domestic title in 2005.

For the 2005–06 UEFA Champions League, after eliminating Tirana in the second qualifying round, CSKA were paired against reigning European champions Liverpool. The club lost 1–3 in the first match in Sofia, but surprisingly won the second leg 1–0 away at Anfield.

In the UEFA Cup, the Reds eliminated Bayer Leverkusen (with Dimitar Berbatov in the team) with two 1–0 wins and reached the group stage, where they finished fifth with three points from four matches and were eliminated. During the winter break of the 2005–06 season, the club was in first place, seven points ahead of Levski. However, during the CSKA lost the seven-point advantage and ultimately finished second, three points behind Levski. Club president Vasil Bozhkov blamed head coach Miodrag Ješić for the failure to capture the title and fired him, while some supporters blamed Bozhkov instead.

Former CSKA head coach Plamen Markov was appointed in Ješić's place. Bozhkov then announced that he would restrict the finances of the club and that during the upcoming season CSKA will not be aiming at the title. In December 2006, Bozhkov sold the club to Indian steel tycoon and owner of Kremikovtzi AD, Pramod Mittal, brother of ArcelorMittal's Lakshmi Mittal. Former Bulgarian politician Aleksandar Tomov became president of the club and assured the supporters that CSKA would, in fact, be aiming at both the championship and the cup. After two draws in the beginning of the spring half of 2006–07, CSKA found themselves six points behind Levski. As a result, Plamen Markov was replaced by Stoycho Mladenov. CSKA finished second.

During the beginning of the 2007–08 season, CSKA purchased players for more than €2 million. The team was unluckily eliminated from the UEFA Cup in the first round by French side Toulouse after a 96th-minute goal from André-Pierre Gignac in the second leg. CSKA was also eliminated from the Bulgarian Cup in the Round of 16 by Lokomotiv Plovdiv. The match was engulfed in a scandal because of three CSKA players who at the time were on loan at Lokomotiv (Stoyko Sakaliev, Aleksandar Branekov and Ivan Ivanov). The players had clauses in their contracts restricting them from playing matches against CSKA, but Lokomotiv's management used the players anyway.

At the end of the season, the Army Men secured the title well in advance, finishing 16 points ahead of second-placed Levski and without losing a single match. On 5 May 2008, the club marked its 60th birthday with big celebrations organized by the management. An alley of fame was built, comprising the names of the most successful current and former players of CSKA. On 24 May 2008, an exhibition match was played between the current squad and a mixed team of Bulgarian and foreign football stars. The mixed team was coached by former German international Lothar Matthäus, who was a special guest for the anniversary celebrations. The match ended 6–6.

In June 2008, only days after CSKA won its 31st title, UEFA notified the Bulgarian Football Union (BFU) that the club would not receive a license for participating in the 2008–09 UEFA Champions League because of unpaid obligations. The BFU then speculated this could also result in CSKA not being able to take part in the domestic championship, effectively turning it into an amateur club. Attempts to arrange a settlement with UEFA proved unsuccessful and CSKA lost its right to compete in the Champions League in favor of runners-up Levski Sofia. The person widely blamed for the crisis was club president Aleksandar Tomov, who resigned shortly after and was arrested and charged with embezzling millions of levs from CSKA and Kremikovtzi AD.

The problems with the license exposed the club's weak financial situation and led to chaos and panic, prompting many of the key players to flee, including head coach Stoycho Mladenov himself, who left saying he was not happy with the fire sale of so many important players. The future of CSKA looked grim, its status as a professional club hanging in the balance. In the midst of the crisis, Dimitar Penev was given the head coach's job for the third time and burdened with the task of saving the club. With almost all senior players gone, Penev had no choice but to rely on members of the CSKA youth squad.

Ultimately, CSKA managed to fulfill all licensing requirements set by the BFU and was allowed to compete in A Group. Despite all the difficulties, and to the surprise of the whole football community, Penev's young squad claimed the Bulgarian Supercup in August 2008, overcoming Litex 1–0.

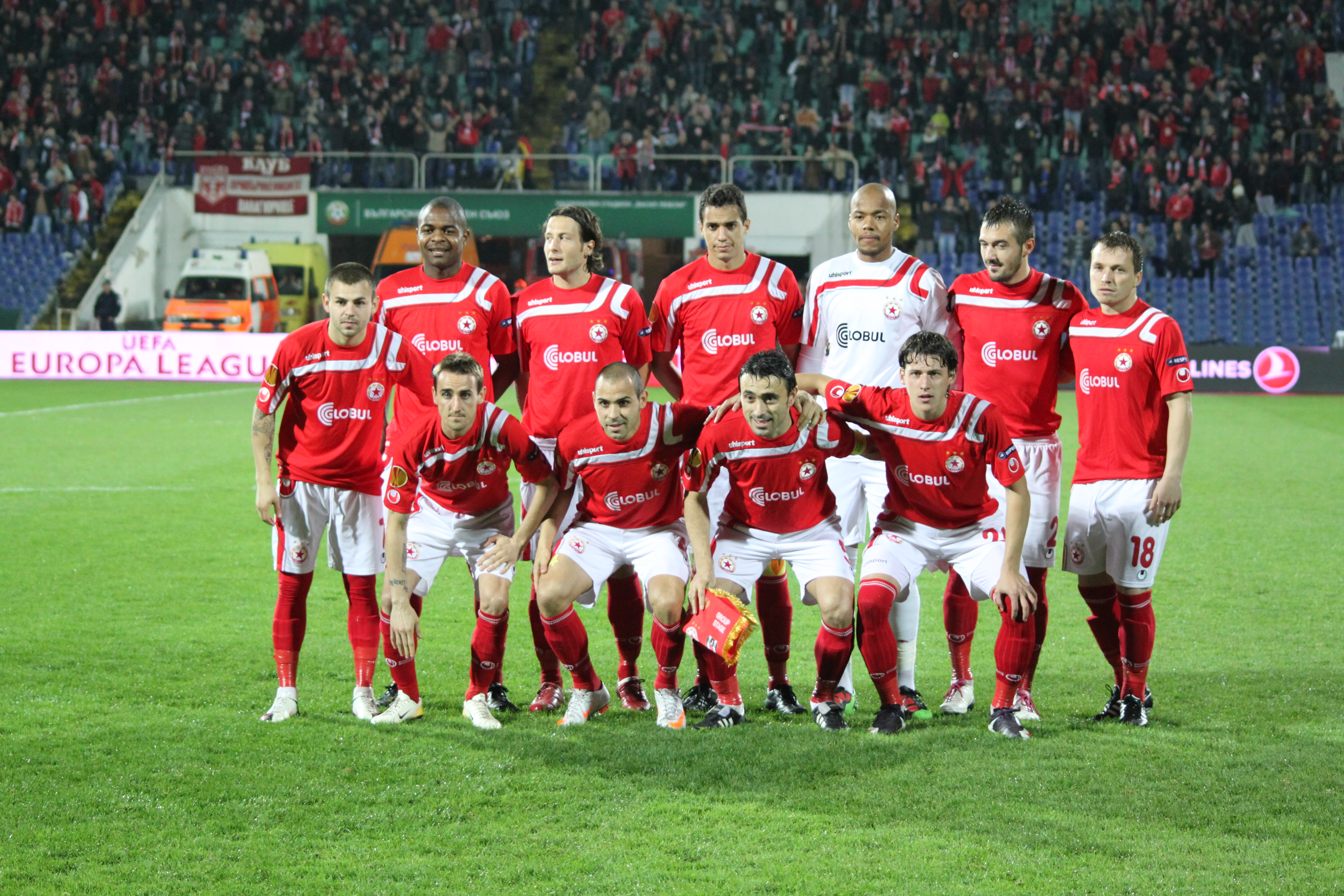
CSKA Sofia in UEFA Europa League 2010

At the beginning of the 2008–09 season, the club managed to strengthen their ranks by signing Bulgarian internationals Zdravko Lazarov and Vladimir Manchev. On 24 December 2008, club owner Pramod Mittal announced he had signed a preliminary contract with a local investor to sell the club. The deal was finalized on 6 March 2009, and the ownership of the club was transferred to Titan Sport EAD, a subsidiary of Bulgarian waste management company Titan AS. Meanwhile, coach Dimitar Penev was replaced by his nephew, Lyuboslav Penev, who set aggressive goals for the club. After having led the league for most of the season, CSKA finished the championship in second place, one point behind arch-rivals Levski.

In 2009, CSKA earned a place in the 2009–10 UEFA Europa League's group stage after defeating Dynamo Moscow in the qualifying round and drew Roma, Basel and Fulham in the group stage. The first match was against Fulham in Sofia, where CSKA took the lead thanks to a beautiful goal by newly signed from Chernomoretz Burgas Brazilian Michel Platini. However, a simple goalkeeper mistake at the end of the match allowed Fulham to score, ending the game in a 1–1 draw. Despite the strong start, CSKA did not manage to earn any more points in the group stage and exited the competition after finishing fourth in its group. In November 2009, coach Luboslav Penev threatened to resign following a squabble with the club's management after they had reversed his decision to reprimand several players for disciplinary reasons, but decided to carry on with the job. Their disagreements eventually boiled over in January 2010 and the board relieved Penev of the position. Reports in the press pointed to former CSKA coach Miodrag Ješić as a possible replacement, but even though Ješić expressed a desire to come back to CSKA, his current contract with Libyan club Al Ittihad Tripoli ruled him out. On 17 January, the club retained Romanian specialist Ioan Andone as coach. Andone brought two Romanian players with him and set out to overhaul the team. However, over the next six matches, CSKA won only two matches, drew arch-rivals Levski 0–0 and lost second place to Lokomotiv Sofia. On 30 March, after two months on the job, Andone resigned, citing family reasons. Former CSKA defender Adalbert Zafirov was put in his place. At the same time, the club turned to Dimitar Penev again, naming him supervisor of the coaching staff. Despite the tumultuous second half of the season, CSKA managed to finish at second place in the table, behind champions Litex, and prepared to enter the third qualifying round of the 2010–11 UEFA Europa League.

=== 2010s ===
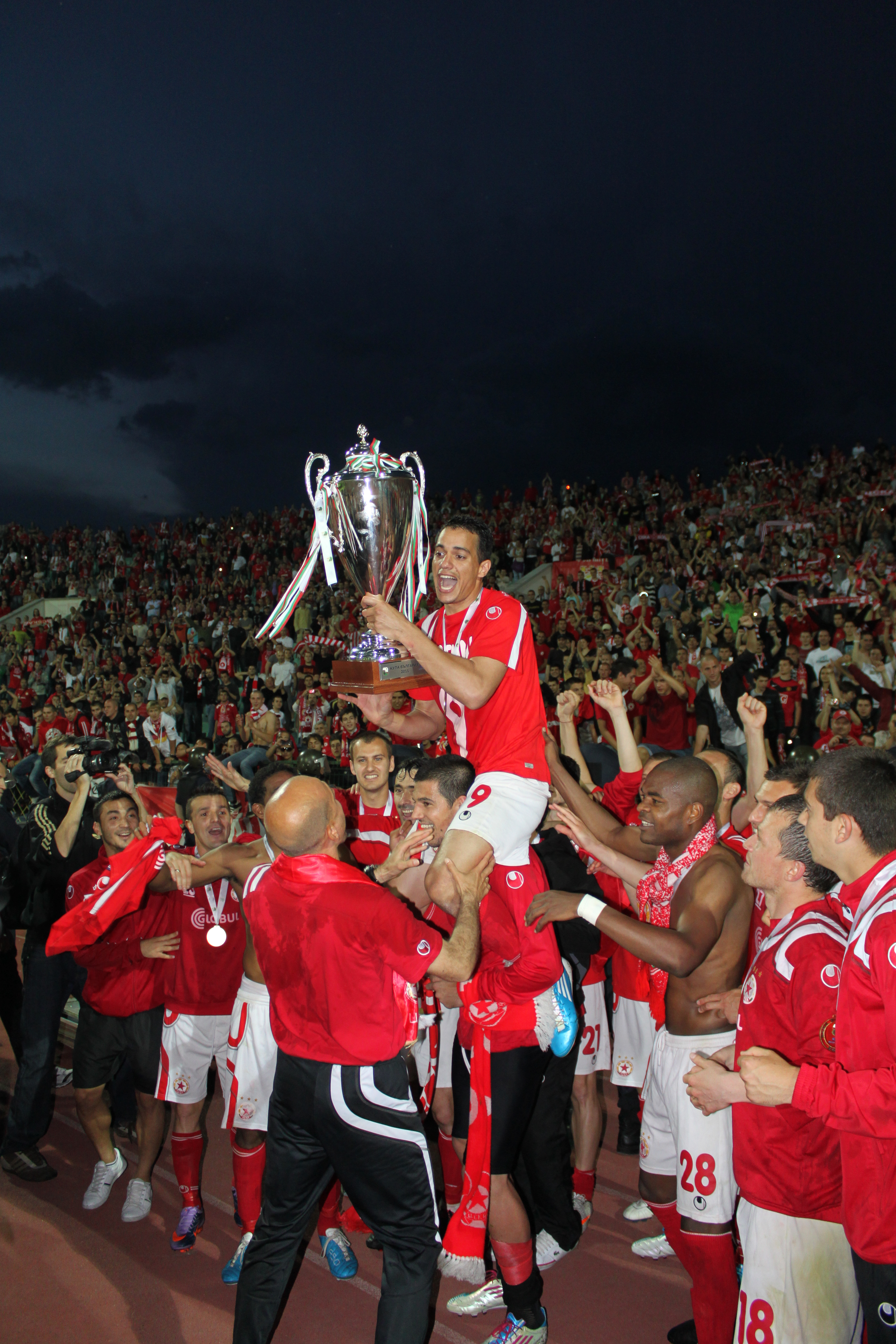
CSKA with the Bulgarian Cup in 2011 Bulgarian Cup final

In the summer of 2010, the club hired Pavel Dochev as head coach, but after a string of unsatisfactory results, including a 0–1 loss to Levski Sofia and a 1–2 loss to Chernomorets Burgas, he was fired. His place was taken by the relatively unknown Macedonian manager Gjore Jovanovski, who kept his job for just three months before being replaced by his assistant Milen Radukanov. Under Radukanov, CSKA won the 2011 Bulgarian Cup and the Bulgarian SuperCup, beating league champions Litex Lovech 3–1.

CSKA started 2011–12 with eight-straight league victories, but after a 1–2 defeat against Slavia Sofia and a 0–0 draw against Cherno More Varna, Radukanov was unexpectedly fired by chairman Dimitar Borisov. Dimitar Penev was appointed as a temporary manager with Adalbert Zafirov as his assistant. In the Stoycho Mladenov was again hired as head coach, and he led the club to a second-place league finish, a single point behind champions Ludogorets Razgrad after losing on the final day of the season.

CSKA began the season by being surprisingly eliminated from international football by Slovenian side Mura 05. While the first leg in Slovenia ended in a 0–0 draw, a 1–1 tie at home eliminated the Reds from the 2012–13 UEFA Europa League in the second qualifying round. The start of the domestic championship was unimpressive as well –- a 0–1 loss to Litex, in which the club had no right to use its new signings due to administrative restrictions. However, in the middle of the autumn half of the season, CSKA achieved some significant wins, defeating Levski 1–0 in the Eternal Derby and eliminating Ludogorets Razgrad in the round of 32 of the Bulgarian Cup.

In late December 2012, head coach Stoycho Mladenov was abruptly fired by the club owners for "disciplinary" reasons, and Miodrag Ješić was appointed in his place. During the winter transfer window, CSKA made several signings, such as Bulgarian internationals Martin Kamburov and Spas Delev, in addition to South-American players Marcinho and Ignacio Varela. After managing the team for only two matches in the Ješić was sacked and replaced by fan favourite Milen Radukanov, with whom the club managed to finish the season with the bronze medals.

In June 2013, former FIFA Ballon d'Or winner Hristo Stoichkov was released from Litex Lovech to replace Radukanov on the bench, but the poor financial condition of the club forced him to leave shortly after his arrival without even having signed a contract. Most of the key players left CSKA while speculations about the club's bankruptcy circled in the media. After the serious financial problems led to CSKA's withdrawal from the 2013–14 UEFA Europa League, igniting multiple fan protests, the club was ultimately declared for sale. On 10 July 2013, it was officially purchased by the Red Champions Group, a union of businessmen and club legends. The leader of the group was Aleksandar Tomov, former club president widely blamed for CSKA's financial crisis in 2008. Stoycho Mladenov was hired back as manager by the new owners.

The club made several major signings for the new season, bringing in former team captains Valentin Iliev, Emil Gargorov and Todor Yanchev. Algeria's national goalkeeper Rais M'Bolhi and ex-Premier League stars Mamady Sidibé and Martin Petrov were also brought on board. On 19 October 2013, the reborn CSKA crushed city rivals Levski 3–0 and were given the nickname The Phoenixes. By the end of the season, CSKA smashed Levski three more times and finished in second place, behind Ludogorets Razgrad.

On 21 March 2014, as part of the plan to reduce debt and make the club's finances more transparent, CSKA became the first club from Eastern Europe to be publicly traded by listing itself on the Bulgarian Stock Exchange.

Before the start of the new season, a few key players were no longer part of the club. Goalkeeper Raïs M'Bolhi was transferred to Major League Soccer (MLS) side Philadelphia Union after an impressive performance at the 2014 FIFA World Cup; young talent Ivaylo Chochev joined Palermo; club legends Martin Petrov and Todor Yanchev retired; and the team's leading scorer, Emil Gargorov, left due to conflict with the managing board. CSKA were surprisingly eliminated by the Moldovan side Zimbru Chișinău in the 2014–15 UEFA Europa League's second qualifying round, but performed well in the domestic league during the first half of the season, beating rivals Levski twice more and being on the top of the table ahead of Ludogorets before the winter break. However, after the season resumed, CSKA lost three-straight matches without scoring a goal, prompting the resignation of head coach Stoycho Mladenov. Former team captain and youth team's coach Galin Ivanov was appointed as the new head coach, but after five more goalless matches, he was replaced by European football legend Lyuboslav Penev, a move widely praised by fans.

On 2 April, CSKA club president Aleksandar Tomov transferred his controlling block of shares to Milko Georgiev and Borislav Lazarov, with club supporters intending to find a new owner and major sponsors capable of paying off the club's numerous debts. On 24 April, it was officially announced the club's new controlling owner would be the corporation Finance Marketing Company Ltd. CSKA finished the season in fifth position, but due to the unfunded debts, the BFU refused to issue the club a license for A Group for the upcoming season, instead sending the club to the South-Western V group, the third tier of Bulgarian football.

On 24 June 2015, businessman Grisha Ganchev announced he would be the new owner of CSKA. Club legend Plamen Markov and famous former footballer Hristo Yanev were appointed as sports director and head coach respectively. Yanev claimed he wants to form a squad consisting entirely of Bulgarian players.

On 25 May 2016, CSKA Sofia won the 2015–16 Bulgarian Cup, becoming the first third-division club to record such an achievement. In the final, CSKA defeated Montana 1–0 to lift the cup for the 20th time in club history.

On 27 May 2016, the legal firm that represented PFC Chavdar Etropole, "PFC Chavdar EAD", was renamed to "PFC CSKA-1948 AD". On 6 June 2016, the legal firm which represented Litex Lovech, "PFC Litex-Lovech AD", was renamed to "PFC CSKA-Sofia EAD", in order for the club to use PFC Litex Lovech's professional license to apply for the reformed First League, with "PFC CSKA-1948 AD" being written in as its owner. The shift was made because the old legal firm, "PFC CSKA AD", was not issued a professional license, and later went bankrupt and ceased operations as of 9 September 2016. Litex Lovech later began playing in the Third League, taking the place of Botev Lukovit.

Following a series of unfavourable results in the championship, Hristo Yanev resigned as head coach. The following week, the son of former Romanian football legend Anghel Iordănescu, Edward Iordănescu, was appointed as head coach. However, on 27 November, following a 1–1 home draw against Vereya, he resigned as head coach.

In September 2017, the club officially announced a sponsorship with Mtel, the largest telecommunications company in Bulgaria. A sponsorship contract was also signed with Bulgarian online gambling company WinBet.

On 11 October 2018, after three auctions, the company holding PFC CSKA-Sofia EAD bought the CSKA Sofia EAD brand, becoming officially the successor of the original club. The transaction was made for the amount of €4 million, thus giving legitimacy to the new entity, even though it had already been accepted by most supporters and ex-legends of the club as the successor of the original club.

=== 2020s ===
The beginning of the decade marked CSKA's return to the European stage. The club earned a place in the group stage of a European tournament for the first time in ten years after eliminating FC Basel in the playoffs of the 2020-21 Europa League.

Stoycho Mladenov was appointed as head coach for the fifth time in club history in the summer of 2021, replacing Lyuboslav Penev. After defeating FK Liepāja, NK Osijek, and Viktoria Plzeň in the qualifying rounds of the UEFA Europa Conference League, the club reached the group stage.

In April 2022, after it became apparent that the club would not win the title, Mladenov abruptly resigned and was replaced by Alan Pardew, the club's technical director, who became the first Englishman ever to manage CSKA.

Pardew, however, would resign two months later following a racist incident where CSKA fans threw bananas at black players during a match against Botev Plovdiv.

For the following 2022-23 season, the club was managed by Serbian football legend Saša Ilić, with whom the Reds came tantalizingly close to winning the title, losing it in the final match to rivals Ludogorets by a single point after Ivan Turitsov missed a penalty in the 95th minute.

== Club identity and supporters ==
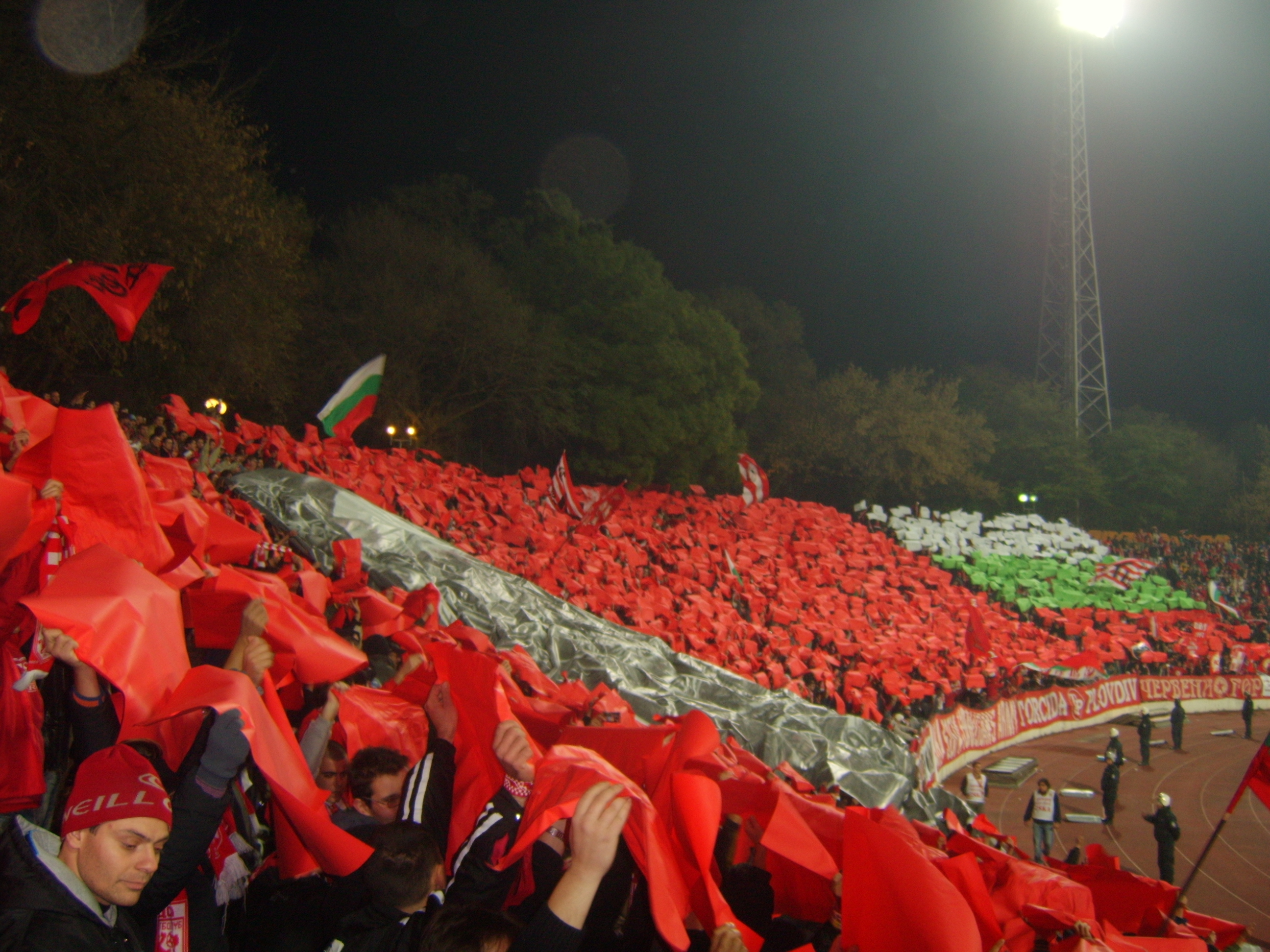
CSKA fans in Sector G during the 2005–06 UEFA Cup Group A game versus Hamburger SV

According to many surveys, CSKA Sofia is one of the two most popular clubs in Bulgaria with approximately 190,000 organized supporters in 799 fan clubs around the world, in almost every country in which there is a large number of Bulgarians. The official fan club was formed in 1990, which to date is the oldest one in the capital of Bulgaria.

CSKA Sofia’s supporter culture has long been intertwined with right‑wing and nationalist currents. The club’s principal ultras section, Sector G, was formally established in 1990 and includes factions such as Animals and Offenders, whose members often espouse nationalistic, antiziganistic and turkophobic beliefs. Sector G maintains friendships with other clubs’ right‑leaning ultras; CSA Steaua București, Partizan Belgrade and CSKA Moscow. Its main rivalry is with Levski Sofia’s Sektor B faction, which is also known for its Nazi and right-wing fans.

Despite official BFU regulations against discrimination, CSKA fans have repeatedly flown Nazi symbols and engaged in racist abuse with limited sanction. In April 2015, a swastika flag at a match prompted only a minimum fine, while monkey chants at a player of colour went unpunished. Independent investigations have documented links between CSKA hooligan elements and broader far‑right networks, including German MMA‑hooligan groups implicated in attacks on Leipzig’s Connewitz district in 2016.

== Honours ==
=== Domestic ===
Bulgarian A Group:

- Champions (31) (record): 1948, 1951, 1952, 1954, 1955, 1956, 1957, 1958, 1958–59, 1959–60, 1960–61, 1961–62, 1965–66, 1968–69, 1970–71, 1971–72, 1972–73, 1974–75, 1975–76, 1979–80, 1980–81, 1981–82, 1982–83, 1986–87, 1988–89, 1989–90, 1991–92, 1996–97, 2002–03, 2004–05, 2007–08

Bulgarian V Group:

- Champions (1): 2015–16

Bulgarian Cup:

- Winners (22 times): 1951, 1954, 1955, 1960–61, 1964–65, 1968–69, 1971–72, 1972–73, 1973–74, 1982–83, 1984–85, 1986–87, 1987–88, 1988–89, 1992–93, 1996–97, 1998–99, 2005–06, 2010–11, 2015–16, 2020–21, 2025–26

Bulgarian Supercup:

- Winners (5): 1989, 2006, 2008, 2011, 2026

Bulgarian Cup – (secondary cup competition)

- Winners (1 time) (shared record): 1980-81

Cup of the Soviet Army – (secondary cup competition)

- Winners (4 times) (record): 1984–85, 1985-86, 1988-89, 1989–90

=== European ===
European Cup / UEFA Champions League

- Semi-finals (2): 1966–67, 1981–82
- Quarter-finals (4): 1956–57, 1973–74, 1980–81, 1989–90

European Cup Winners' Cup / UEFA Cup Winners' Cup

- Semi-finals (1): 1988–89

UEFA Cup / UEFA Europa League:

- Round of 32 (3): 1984–85, 1991–92, 1998–99
- Group stage (4): 2005–06, 2009–10, 2010–11, 2020–21

UEFA Europa Conference League

- Group stage (1): 2021–22

Biggest win in European tournaments:

- UEFA Champions League – 8–1 in 1956–57 vs Dinamo București
- UEFA Europa League – 8–0 in 2000–01 vs Constructorul; 5–0 in 1999–00 vs Portadown
- UEFA Cup Winners' Cup – 9–0 in 1970–71 vs Haka; 8–0 in 1993–94 vs Balzers; 5–0 in 1988–89 vs Inter Bratislava
- UEFA Europa Conference League – 4–0 in 2022–23 vs Makedonija GP
- UEFA Intertoto Cup – 4–1 in 1996 vs Hibernians

=== Other trophies ===
Tournament for Stalin's Birthday, Bulgaria:

- Winners (1): 1951

Tournament in Antwerp, Belgium:

- Winners (1): 1958

Allied Armies Spartakiade:

- Winners (1): 1958

Republican Spartakiad, Bulgaria:

- Winners (1): 1959

Mohammed V Trophy, Morocco:

- Winners (1): 1967

Trofeo Ciudad de Palma, Spain:

- Winners (2): 1970, 1971

Blitz Tournament Smolyan, Bulgaria:

- Winners (1): 1976

Trofeo Costa de Valencia, Spain:

- Winners (1): 1976

Trofeo Ciudad de Zaragoza, Spain:

- Winners (1): 1977

Cup Olympic Fire, Bulgaria:

- Winners (1): 1980

Torneio Costa Azul, Portugal:

- Winners (2): 1989, 1991

Tournament Shumen, Bulgaria:

- Winners (1): 1993

Cup Grand-hotel Varna, Bulgaria:

- Winners (1): 1995

PlayStation Cup, Bulgaria:

- Winners (4) (record): 2002, 2005, 2006, 2007

Thöle-Pokal, Germany:

- Winners (1): 2003

Arona Cup, Spain:

- Winners (1): 2004

Аrcadia Cup, Turkey:

- Winners (1): 2007

Sporx Cup, Netherlands and Germany:

- Winners (1): 2007

IFC Pego Cup, Spain:

- Winners (1) (record): 2008

Albena Cup, Bulgaria:

- Winners (1): 2009

Martyrs of 17 February Cup, Libya:

- Winners (1): 2012

Tournament Tsarsko selo, Bulgaria:

- Winners (1): 2016

Stubai Cup, Austria:

- Winners (1): 2017

== Club crest ==
The main element in the current club crest is the red five-pointed star – symbol of glory and power. Red was the colour of the uniform of the Roman legions, associated with love, freedom and aggression. The six oak leaves above the star symbolise strength, endurance and traditions. CSKA's name and year of foundation (1948) can be seen below the star, between two Bulgarian flags. The circle form of the crest symbolises infinity and eternity.

After CSKA won its 30th national title in 2005, three golden stars were added to the logo. In 2017, to celebrate the 70th anniversary of the club, CSKA introduced an updated crest.

"Atletik – Slava (AS`23)" (1923–44)

"Chavdar (from 1948 – CDV)" (1944–48)

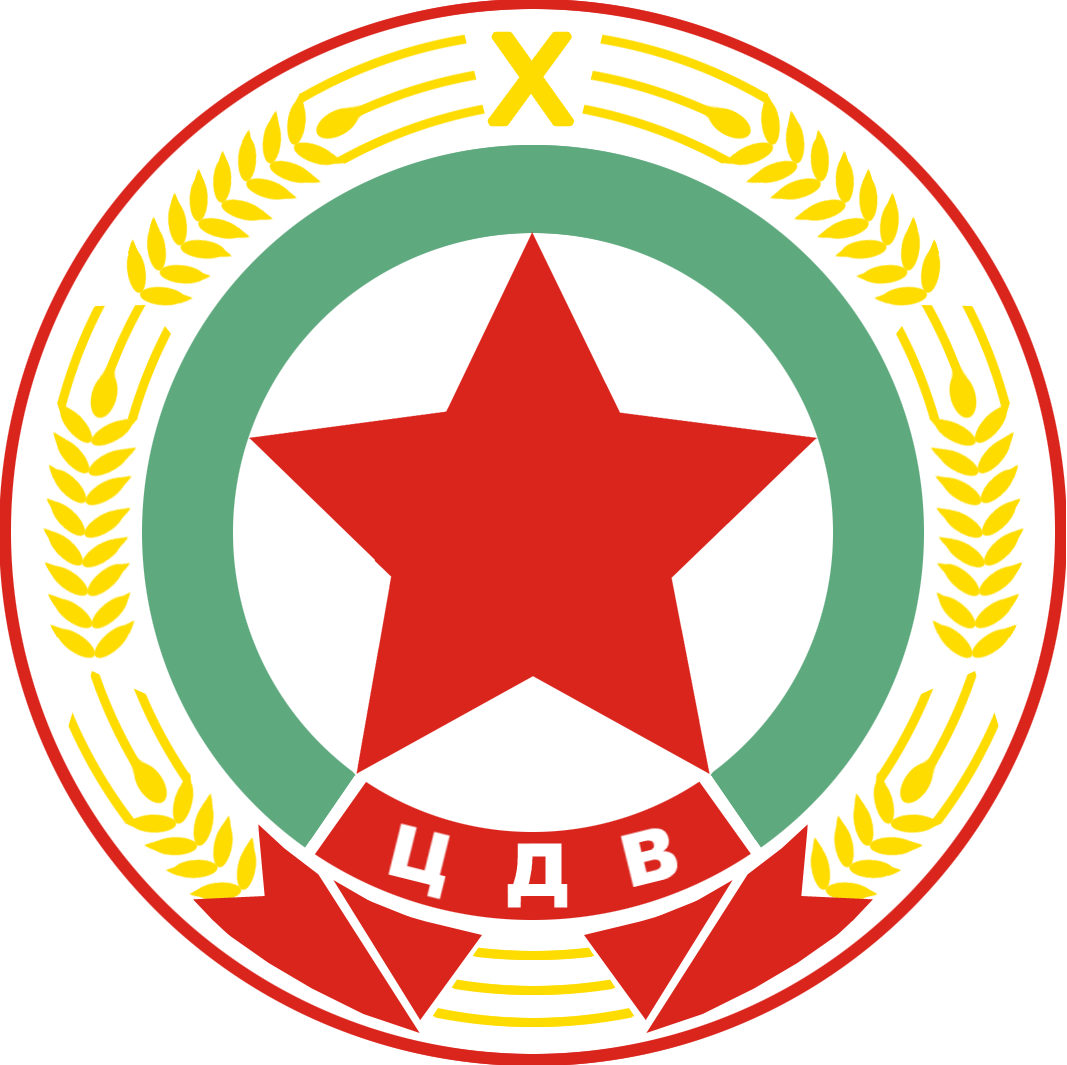
"Septemvri pri CDV" (1948–49)

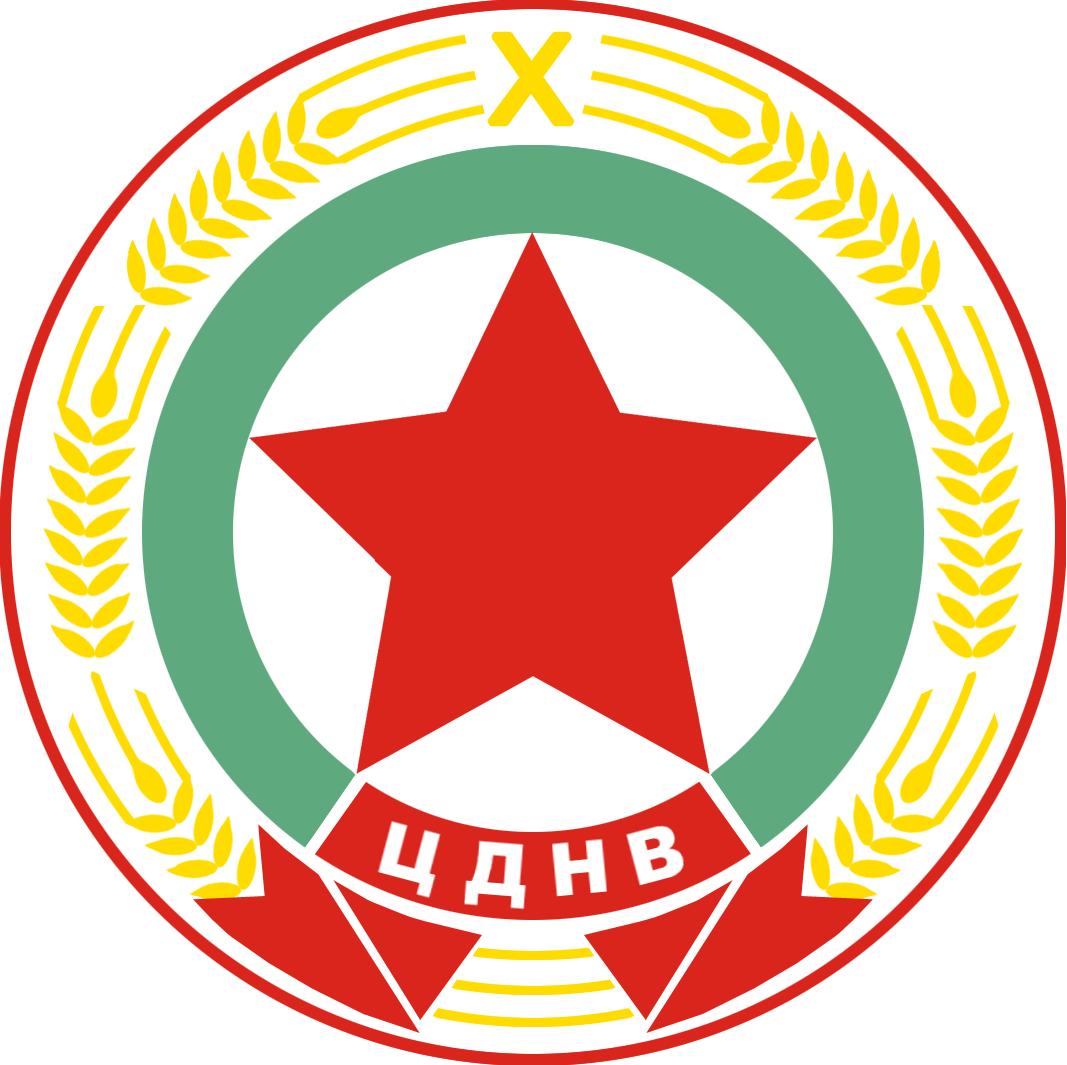
"CDNV" (1950–1953)

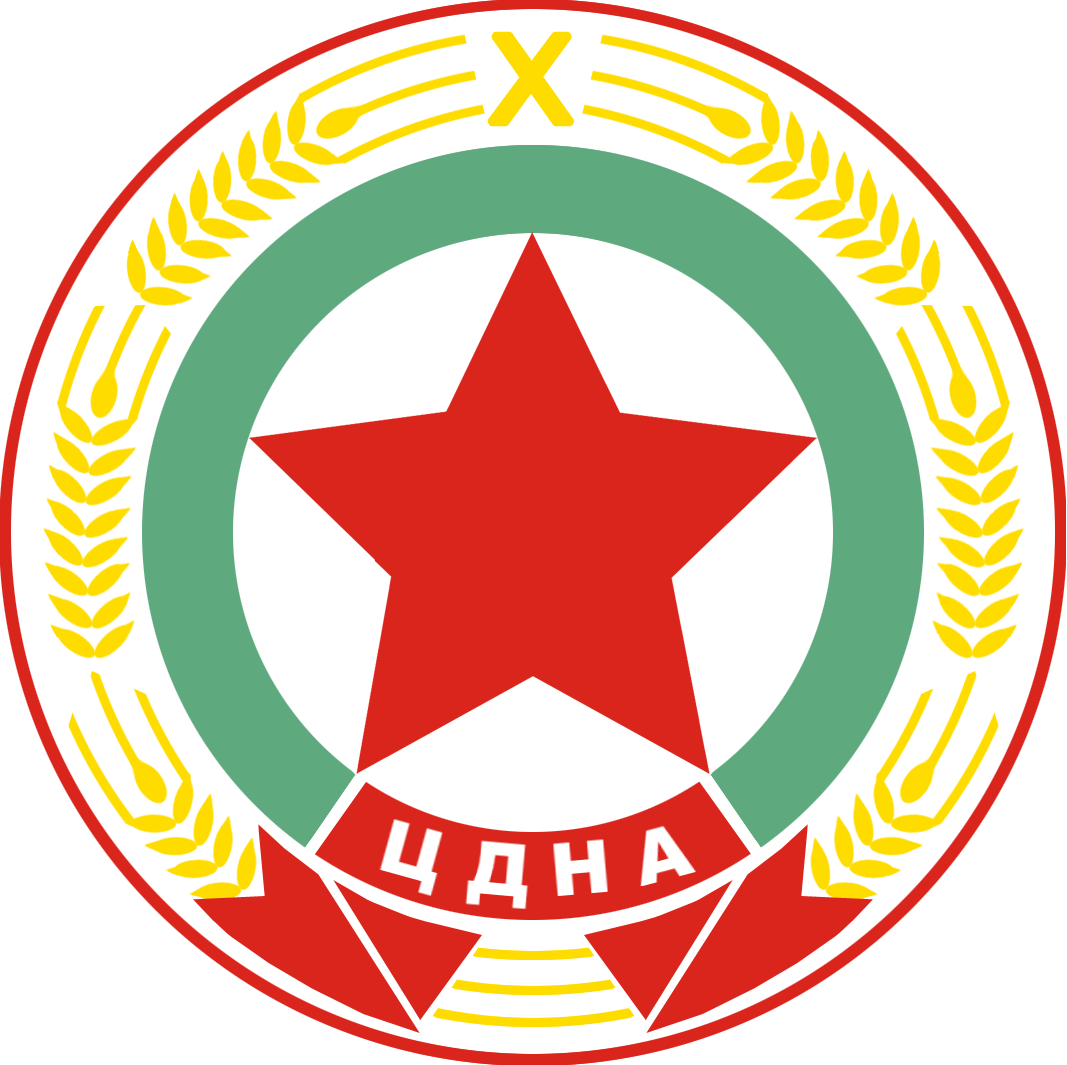
"CDNA" (1954–1962)

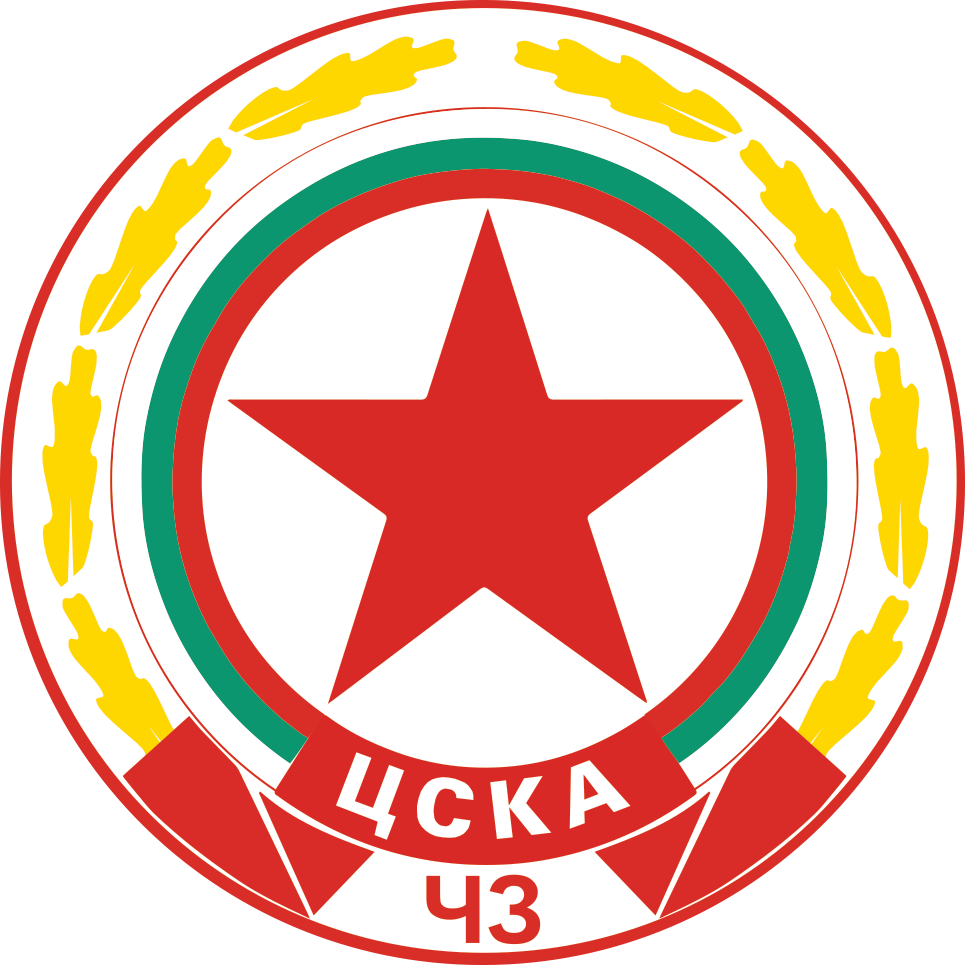
"CSKA Cherveno Zname" (1962–1968)

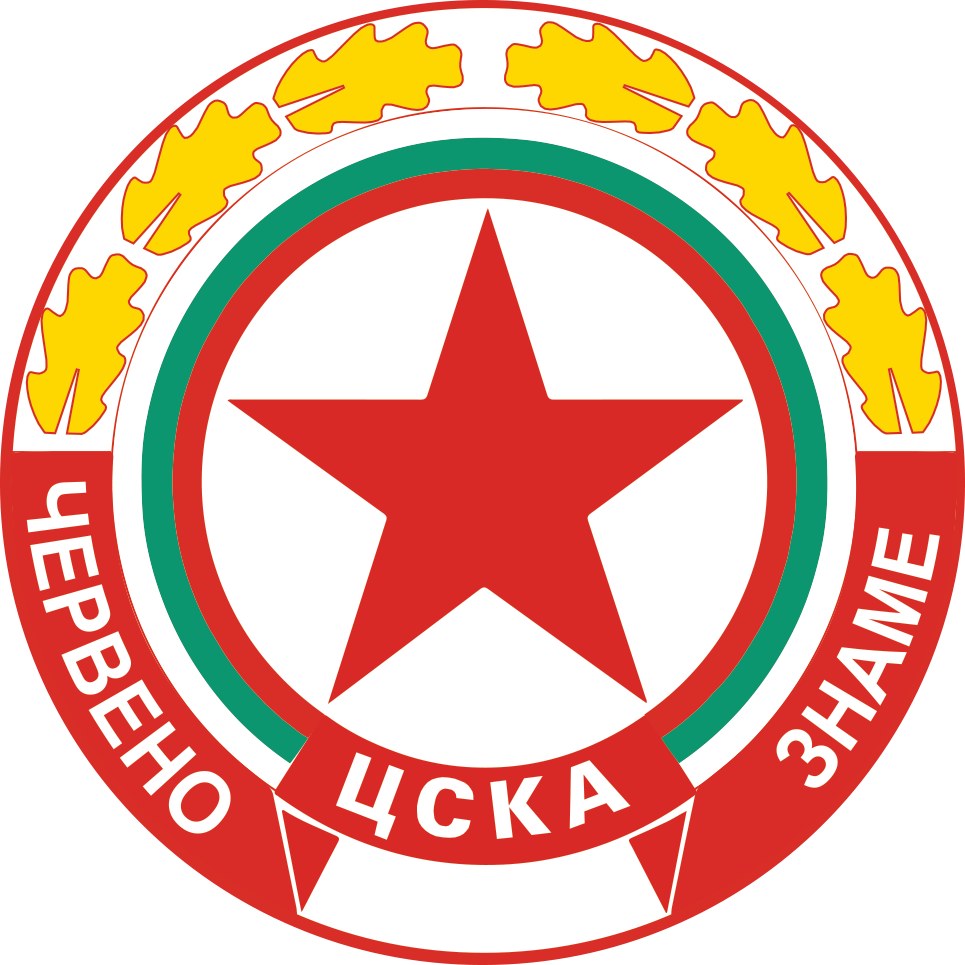
"CSKA Cherveno Zname" alternative (1964–1968)

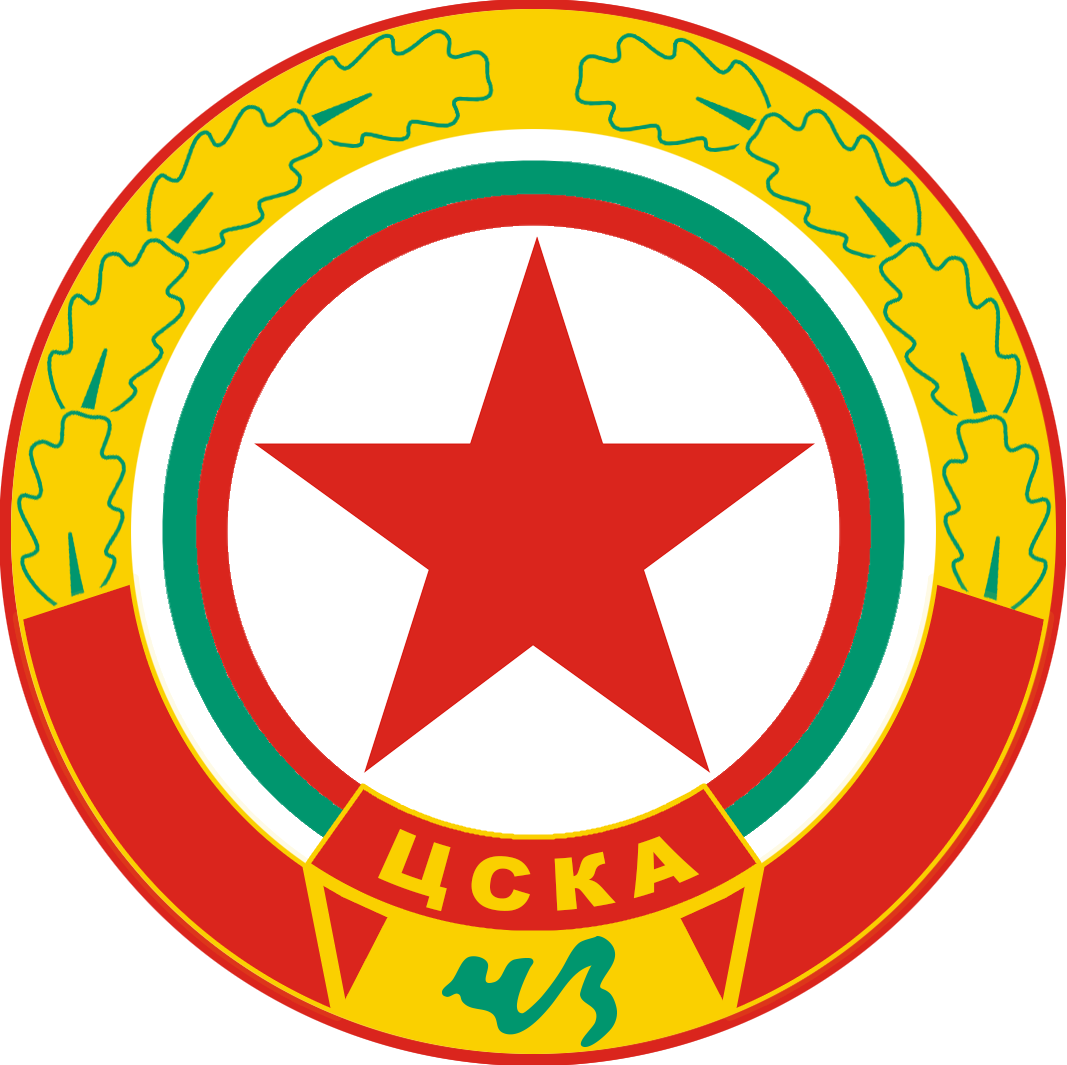
"CSKA Cherveno Zname" alternative (1965–1968)

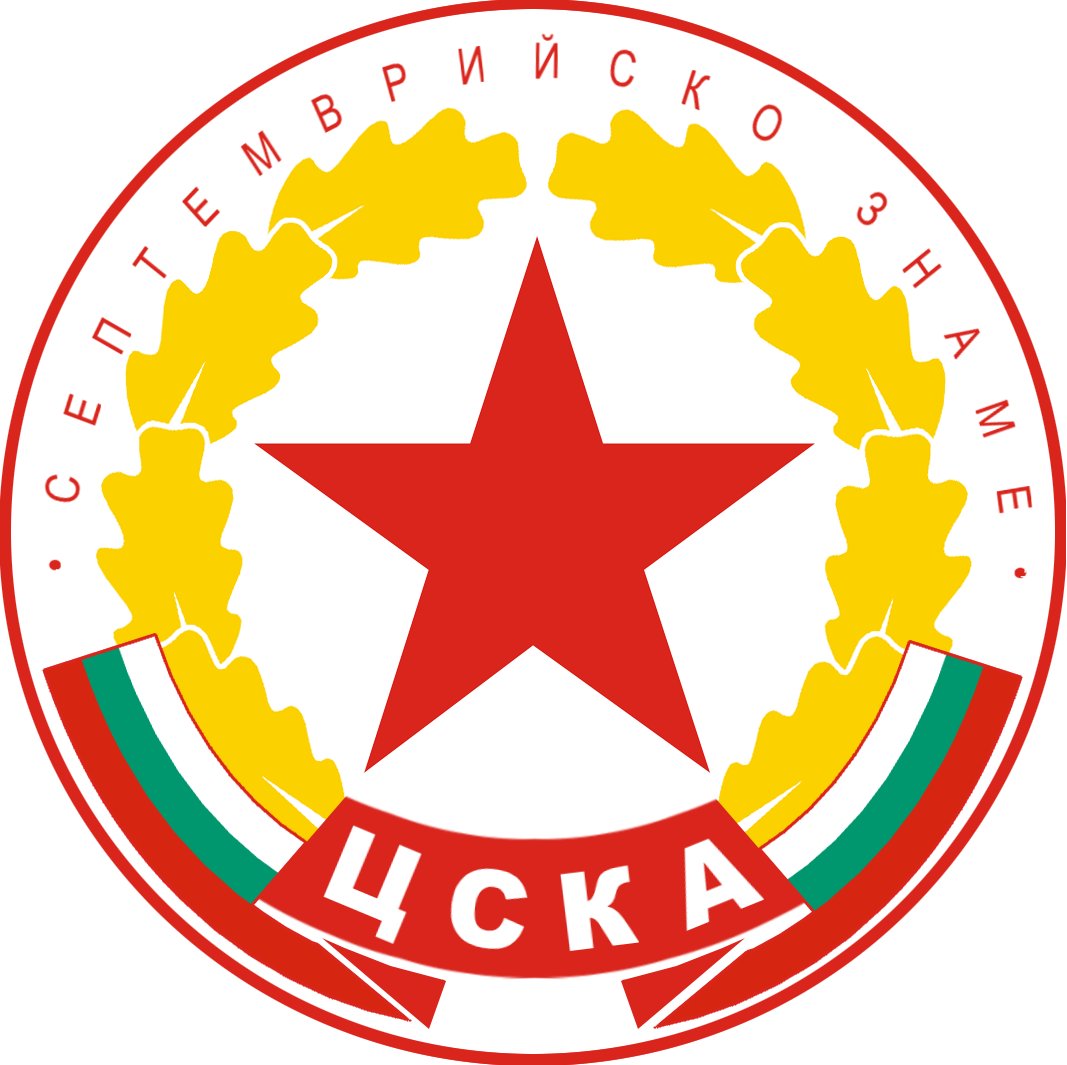
"CSKA Septemvriysko Zname" (1968–1985)

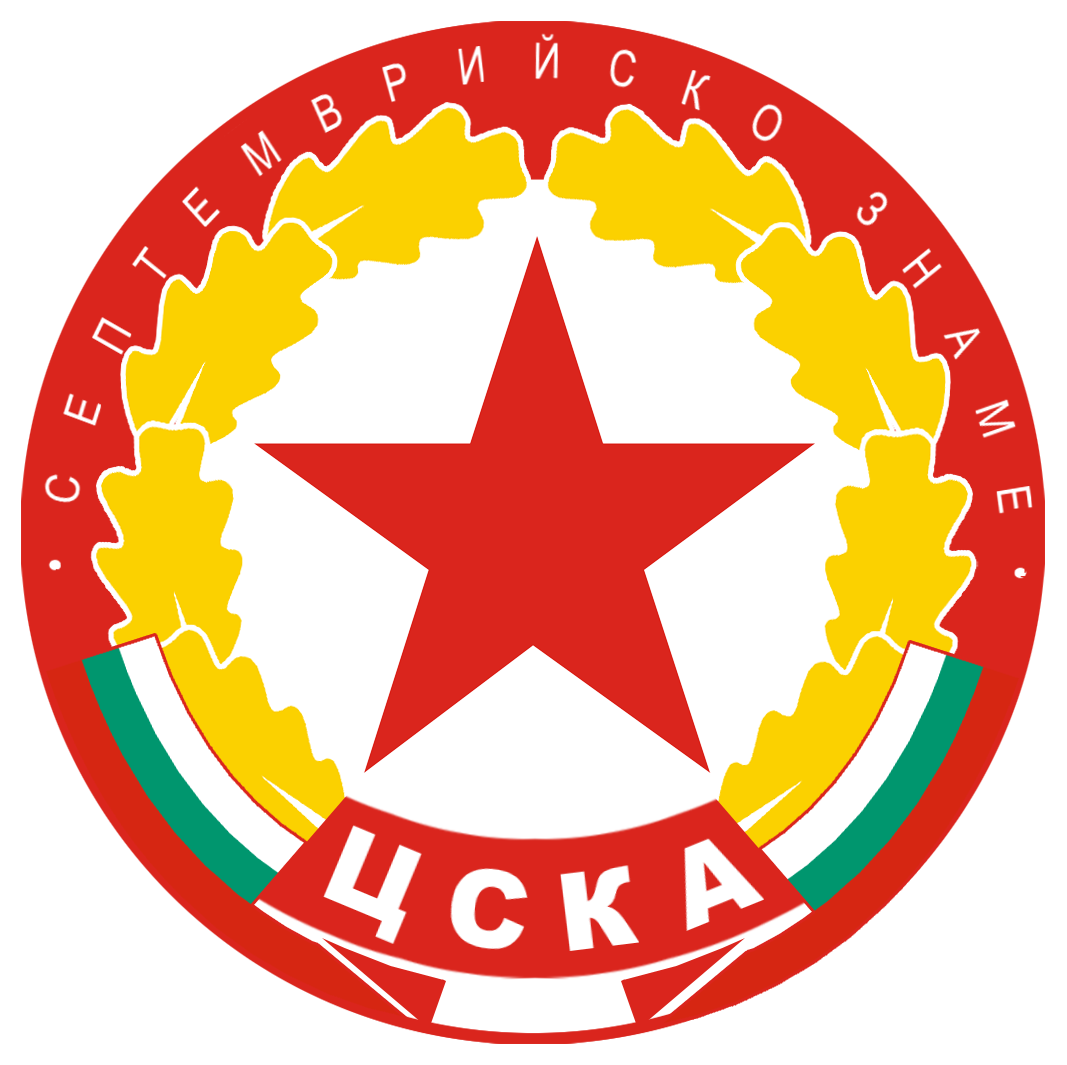
"CSKA Septemvriysko Zname" alternative (1968–1985)

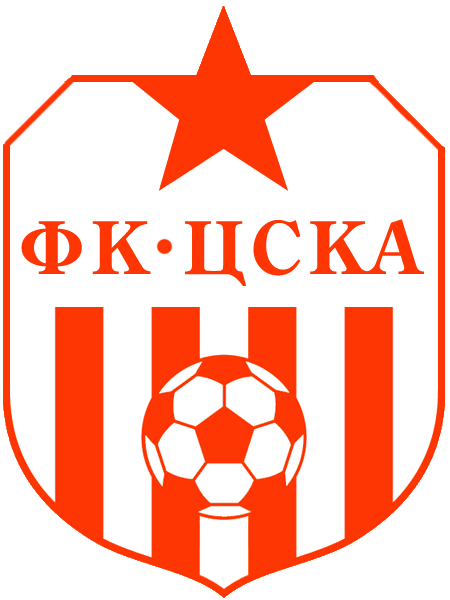
"CSKA Septemvriysko Zname" European championships (1968–1985)

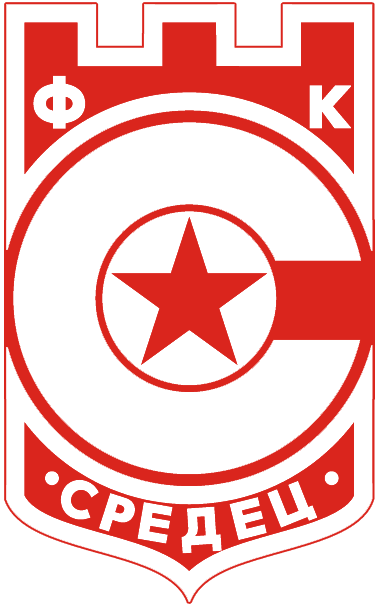
"CFKA Sredets" (1985–1989)

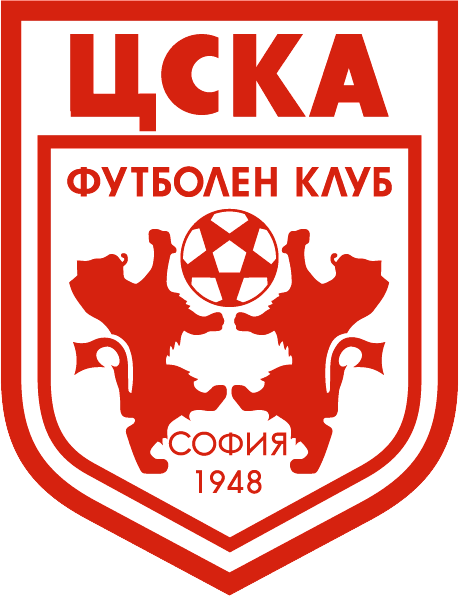
"CSKA" (1987–1988) and (1990–1998)

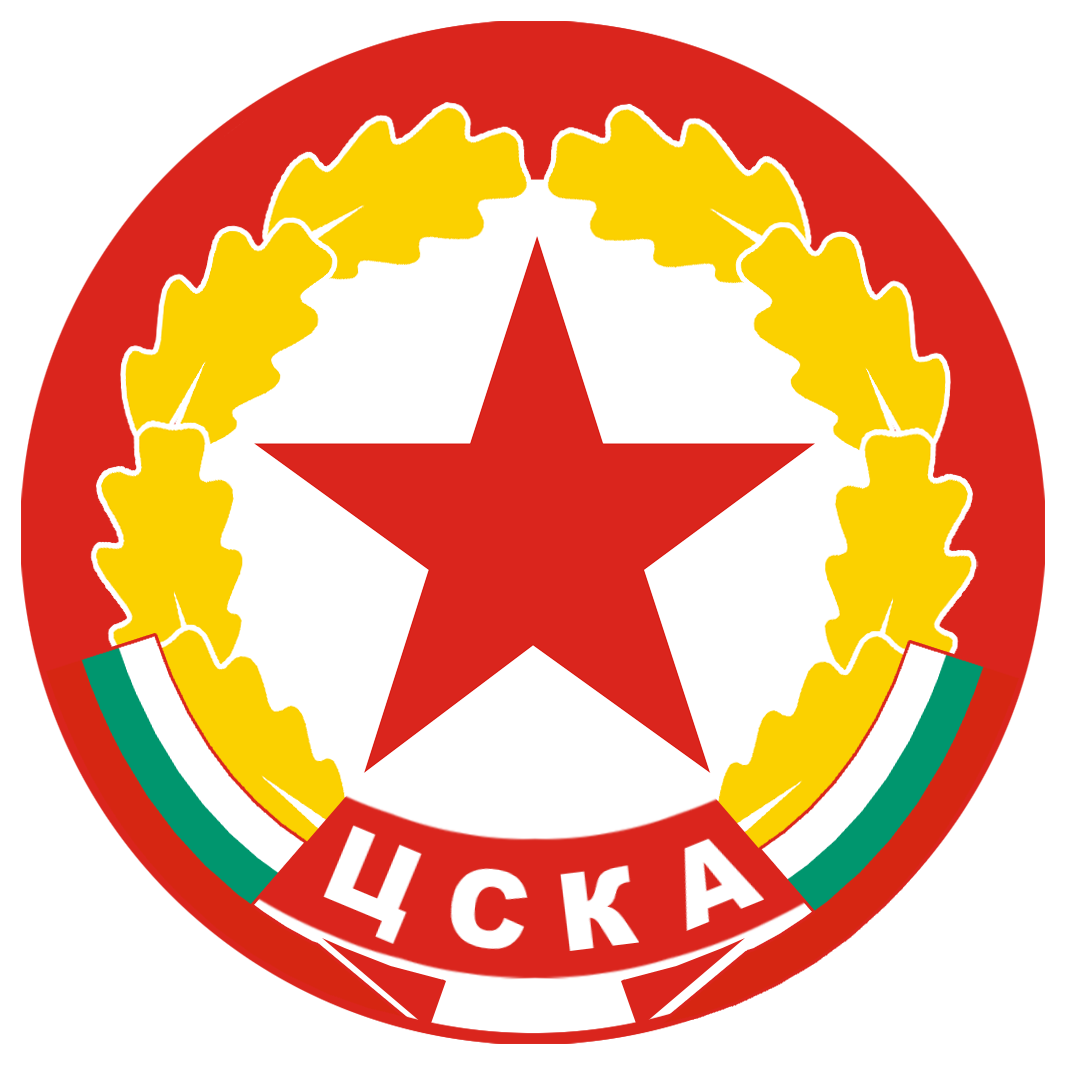
"CSKA" (1998)

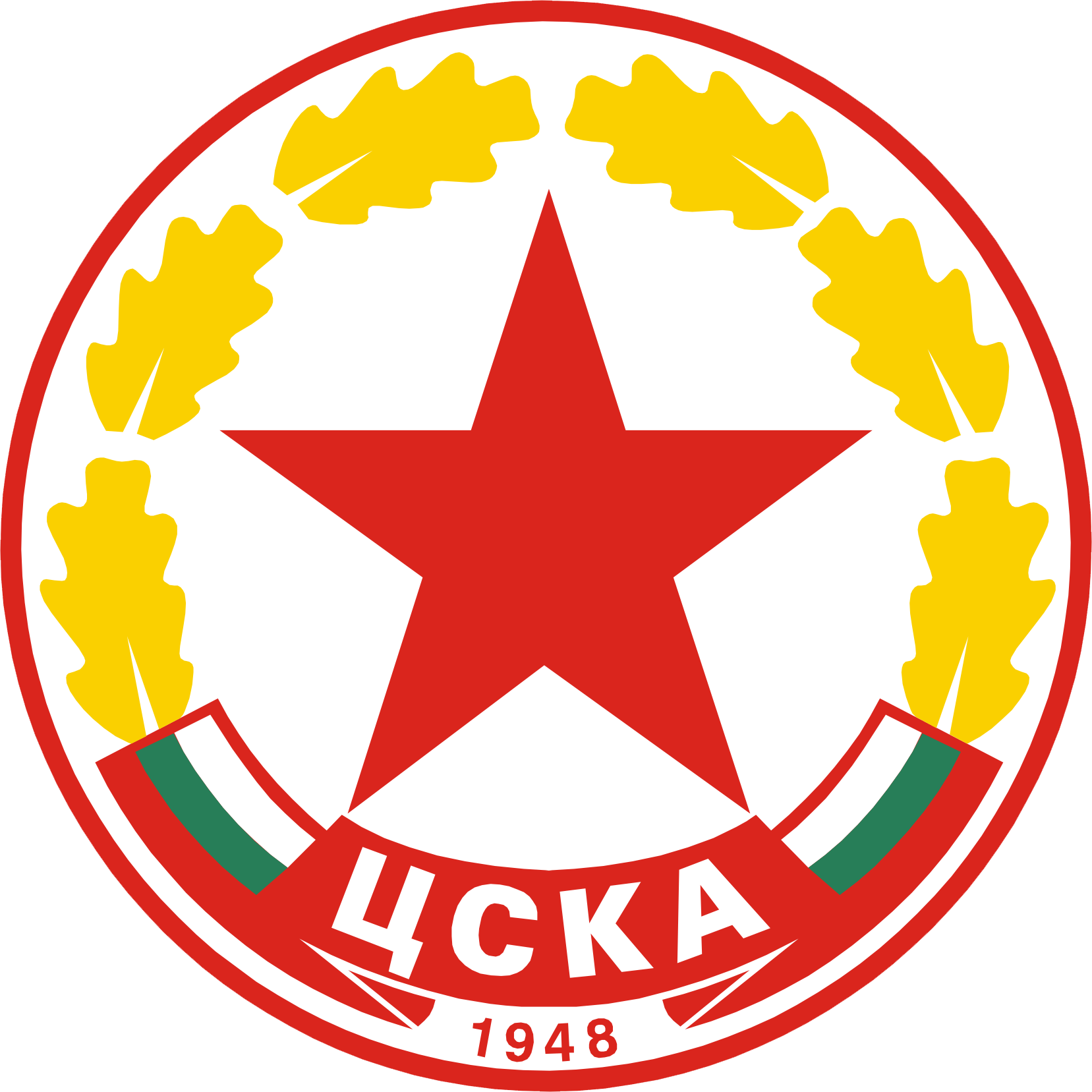
"CSKA" (1989) and (1998–2005)

"CSKA" (2005–2017)

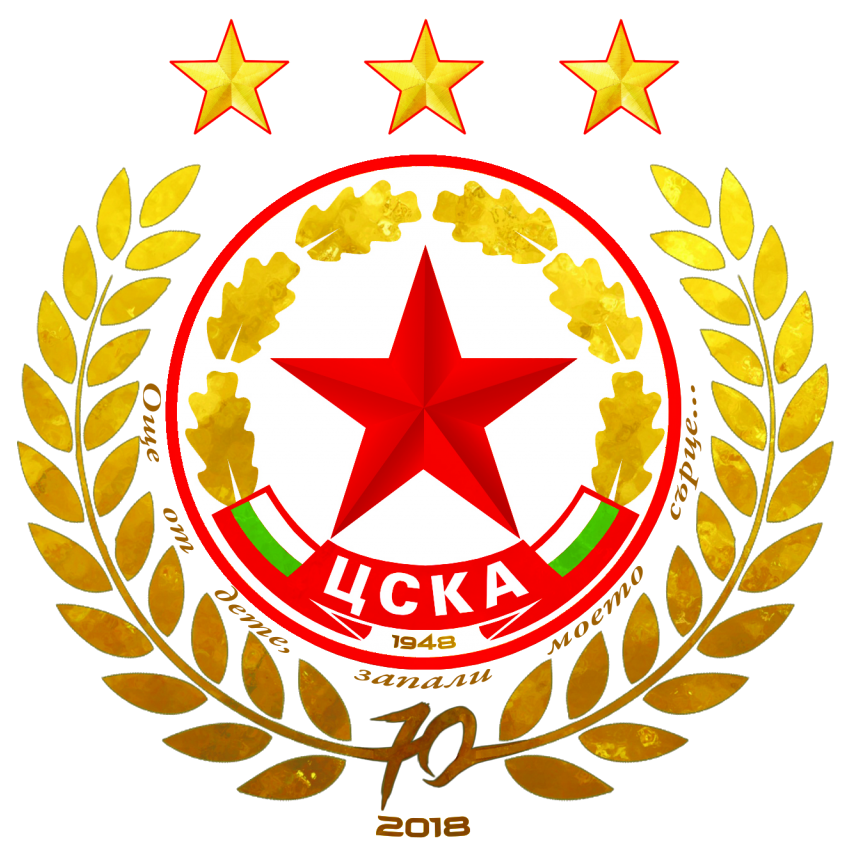
"CSKA" (2017–2019)

"CSKA" (2019–present)

== Names ==
CSKA has carried a plethora of names throughout its history. In chronological order, they are as follows:

- Septemvri pri CDV (Bulgarian: Септември при ЦДВ), September at the Central House of the Troops in 1948 and 1948/49.
- Narodna Voiska (Bulgarian: Народна Войска), People's Troops in 1950.
- C.D.N.V. (Bulgarian: Централен Дом на Народната Войска, Ц.Д.Н.В.), Central House of the People's Troops in 1951 and 1952.
- Otbor na Sofiyskiya Garnizon (Bulgarian: Отбор на Софийския Гарнизон), Team of the Sofia's garrison in 1953.
- CDNA (Bulgarian: ЦДНА, Централен Дом на Народната Армия), Central House of the People's Army from 1954 and until the 1961/62 season.
- CSKA "Cherveno zname" (Bulgarian: ЦСКА „Червено знаме“), CSKA "Red Flag" between 1962/63 and 1967/68.
- CSKA "Septemvriysko zname" (Bulgarian: ЦСКА „Септемврийско знаме“), CSKA "September's flag" between 1968/69 and 1984/85.
- CFKA "Sredets" (Bulgarian: ЦФКА „Средец“), Central Football Club of the Army "Sredets" from 1985/86 and until 1988/89
- CSKA (Bulgarian: ЦСКА), CSKA – Central Sports Club of the Army since 1989/90.

== Shirt sponsors and manufacturers ==
Period	Kit Manufacturer	Shirt Sponsor
1948–75	(Bulgaria) locally produced	None
1975–83	(Germany) Adidas	None
1983–85	(Germany) Puma	None
1985–89	(Germany) Adidas	None
1989–90	(Germany) Adidas	Comco
1990–91	(Germany) Adidas	Sintofarm
1991–92	(Italy) ABM	Sintofarm
1991–92	(United Kingdom) Umbro	Sintofarm
1992–95	(Italy) Erreà	Sintofarm
1995–96	(Italy) Lotto	Sintofarm
1996–99	(Germany) Puma	Multigroup
1999–00	(Germany) Puma	None
2000–01	(United States) Nike	None
2001–03	(Italy) Lotto	None
2003–04	(Japan) ASICS	None
2004–05	(Germany) Uhlsport	None
2005–08	(Germany) Uhlsport	Vivatel
2008–09	(Germany) Uhlsport	None
2009–11	(Germany) Uhlsport	Globul
2011–12	(Italy) Kappa	Globul
2012–13	(Italy) Legea	Globul
2013–15	(Italy) Legea	None
2015–16	(Italy) Lotto	None
2016–22	(Germany) Adidas	A1 / WINBET
2022–	(Italy) Macron	WINBET / A1

- Only Domestic Cup matches

== European record ==
Updated 31 July 2026

Competition	S	P	W	D	L	GF	GA	GD
UEFA Champions League / European Cup	25	98	41	16	41	140	144	–4
UEFA Cup Winners' Cup / European Cup Winners' Cup	5	22	12	0	10	49	29	+20
UEFA Europa League / UEFA Cup	26	120	42	36	42	153	143	+10
UEFA Conference League	3	20	5	5	10	18	27	−9
UEFA Intertoto Cup	1	4	2	1	1	8	4	+4
Total	60	264	102	58	104	368	347	+21

=== UEFA ranking ===
As of 22 May 2026

Rank	Team	Points
231	(Serbia) FK Čukarički	6.500
231	(Azerbaijan) Neftchi Baku	6.500
231	(Bulgaria) CSKA Sofia	6.500
238	(Scotland) Dundee United	6.410
238	(Scotland) Kilmarnock	6.410

== Players ==
=== Current squad ===
As of 8 September 2026

Note: Flags indicate national team as defined under FIFA eligibility rules; some limited exceptions apply. Players may hold more than one non-FIFA nationality.

No.	Pos.	Nation	Player
2	DF	BRA	Pastor
3	DF	BEN	Tamimou Ouorou (on loan from Botev Vratsa)
4	DF	POR	Dinis Almeida
5	DF	CIV	Jean-Philippe Gbamin
6	MF	POR	Bruno Jordão (captain)
7	MF	BLR	Max Ebong
8	MF	ITA	Stefano Sensi
9	FW	ARG	Santiago Godoy
10	FW	NED	Joël Zwarts
11	MF	FRA	Mohamed Brahimi
14	DF	BUL	Teodor Ivanov (vice-captain)
17	DF	ARG	Ángelo Martino
19	DF	BUL	Andrey Yordanov
21	GK	BLR	Fyodor Lapoukhov

No.	Pos.	Nation	Player
25	GK	BUL	Dimitar Evtimov
28	FW	CYP	Ioannis Pittas
30	MF	BUL	Petko Panayotov
31	GK	BUL	Daniel Nikolov
32	DF	ARG	Facundo Rodríguez (on loan from Estudiantes)
34	FW	BUL	Vasil Kaymakanov
37	DF	IRL	Barry Cotter
38	FW	BRA	Léo Pereira
67	MF	ROU	Cătălin Itu
80	MF	BUL	Georgi Chorbadzhiyski
91	DF	BUL	Aleks Tunchev
94	MF	CAF	Isaac Solet
99	MF	CMR	James Eto'o

For recent transfers, see Transfers summer 2026.

=== On loan ===
Note: Flags indicate national team as defined under FIFA eligibility rules; some limited exceptions apply. Players may hold more than one non-FIFA nationality.

No.	Pos.	Nation	Player
—	DF	GAM	Sainey Sanyang (at Botev Vratsa)
—	MF	ALB	Kevin Dodaj (at Lechia Gdańsk)
—	MF	BUL	Yulian Iliev (at Lokomotiv Plovdiv)

No.	Pos.	Nation	Player
—	MF	BUL	Ivan Tasev (at Cherno More)
—	FW	COL	Alejandro Piedrahita (at Toronto FC)

=== Reserve team and Youth Academy ===
Note: Flags indicate national team as defined under FIFA eligibility rules; some limited exceptions apply. Players may hold more than one non-FIFA nationality.

No.	Pos.	Nation	Player
12	GK	BUL	Georgi Gerginov
20	DF	BUL	Martin Stoychev
27	FW	BUL	Yulian Gilov
35	DF	BUL	Lachezar Ivanov

No.	Pos.	Nation	Player
36	FW	BUL	Radoslav Zhivkov
37	FW	BUL	Martin Sorakov
47	MF	BUL	Alesandro Nikolov
98	DF	BUL	Bozhidar Petrov

=== Foreign players ===
Up to twenty foreign nationals can be registered and given a squad number for the first team in the Bulgarian First League, however only five non-EU/EEA nationals can be used during a match day. Those non-EU/EEA nationals with European ancestry can claim citizenship from the nation their ancestors came from. If a player does not have European ancestry he can claim Bulgarian citizenship after playing in Bulgaria for 5 years.

EU/EEA Nationals

- (Cyprus) Ioannis Pittas
- (Italy) Stefano Sensi
- (Netherlands) Joël Zwarts
- (Portugal) Bruno Jordão
- (Romania) Cătălin Itu
- (Portugal) Dinis Almeida
- (Republic of Ireland) Barry Cotter

EU/EEA Nationals (Dual citizenship)

- (Argentina) (Italy) Ángelo Martino
- (Argentina) (Italy) Facundo Rodríguez
- (Central African Republic) (France) Isaac Solet
- (Cameroon) (Bulgaria) James Eto'o
- (Ivory Coast) (France) Jean-Philippe Gbamin
- (France) (Algeria) Mohamed Brahimi

Non-EU/EEA Nationals

- (Argentina) Santiago Godoy
- (Belarus) Max Ebong
- (Belarus) Fyodor Lapoukhov
- (Benin) Tamimou Ouorou
- (Brazil) Pastor
- (Brazil) Léo Pereira

== Balgarska Armia Stadium ==
The new Balgarska Armia Stadium, home of CSKA Sofia.

The team's home stadium, Balgarska Armia (Bulgarian Army in English), was first completed in 1967 and stands on the same spot as its predecessor, Athletic Park. It is situated in the Borisova gradina park, named after Bulgarian tsar Boris III, in Sofia's city centre.

In 2023, the old stadium was demolished and construction of a new venue started in its place. On October 31st 2026, the new ground was officially inaugurated with a Bulgarian league home game versus another team from Sofia, Slavia.

The new venue is an all-covered stadium with a domestic league capacity of 18 540 spectators (standing and seated) and an international competitions capacity of 15 819 (seating only). It features 2 video boards (one behind each side), a 400-meter LED ribbon board and food&drinks facilities in every sector. On the façade of the ultras Sector G, there's an outside video screen in front of a renovated amphitheatre (built where the old stadium's sector G used to be) where fans outside the stadium can watch certain games together.

The stadium also hosts the CSKA Sofia Glory Museum, the club's official fanshop and The Army restaurant.

== Managerial history ==
This is a list of the last 10 CSKA Sofia managers:

Name	Nat	From	To	Honours
Saša Ilić	(Serbia)	2 June 2022	28 July 2023	—
Nestor El Maestro	(Serbia) (England)	29 July 2023	14 April 2024	—
Stamen Belchev (caretaker)	(Bulgaria)	15 April 2024	31 May 2024	—
Tomislav Stipić	(Croatia)	4 June 2024	28 August 2024	—
Aleksandar Tomash	(Bulgaria)	28 August 2024	31 May 2025	—
Dušan Kerkez	(Bosnia and Herzegovina)	4 June 2025	20 September 2025	—
Valentin Iliev (caretaker)	(Bulgaria)	20 September 2025	24 September 2025	—
Hristo Yanev	(Bulgaria)	24 September 2025	9 September 2026	1 Bulgarian Cup; 1 Bulgarian Supercup
Daniel Morales (caretaker)	(Brazil)	10 September 2026	29 September 2026	—
Markus Gisdol	(Germany)	29 September 2026	Present	—

== Club officials ==
=== Board of directors ===
Name	Role
(Bulgaria) Valter Papazki	Owner
(Bulgaria) Danail Iliev	President
(Bulgaria) Vangel Vangelov	Executive Director
(Bulgaria) Valentin Iliev	Sports Director
(Bulgaria) Mihail Aleksandrov	Technical Director
(Bulgaria) Boyko Velichkov	Academy Director
(Bulgaria) Petar Stoyanov	Financial Director

=== Current technical body ===
Name	Role
(Germany) Markus Gisdol	Head coach
(Germany) Rainer Widmayer	Assistant coach
(Germany) Jakob Braun	Assistant coach
(Bulgaria) Ivaylo Ivanov	Goalkeeper coach
(Bulgaria) Kostadin Jorgov	Fitness coach
(Bulgaria) Martin Stoyanov	Analyst
(Bulgaria) Martin Mitov	Analyst
(Bulgaria) Ivan Ivanov	Psychologist
(Cuba) (Bulgaria) Orlando Morera	Technical Associate
(Bulgaria) Ivaylo Yakimov	Club doctor
(Bulgaria) Ivan Hristov	Physiotherapist
(Bulgaria) Stanislav Krastev	Physiotherapist
(Bulgaria) Aleks Mladenov	Physiotherapist
(Bulgaria) Kostadin Tsvetkov	Nutritionist
(Bulgaria) Metodi Tomanov	Chief Scout
(Bulgaria) Galin Ivanov	Scout
(Bulgaria) Tsvetomir Valeriev	Scout
(Bulgaria) Viktor Ignatov	Press Officer
(Bulgaria) Dimitar Vutov	Administrator
(Bulgaria) Petar Zanev	Coordinator
(Bulgaria) Dobri Dimov	Housekeeper

== Club kits ==
After the merger between Chavdar Sofia and Septemvri Sofia, it was accepted the club's home colour would be red. White became the club's away colour.

In previous years, black was also used, mainly for away or third kits. Other colours of the CSKA kits that can be seen are grey, yellow, orange and green, but only in rarely occasions and only in the colour scheme of the third kits. In the 2009–10 season, and for the first time in club history, CSKA used gold for their away kits.

After the 2011–12 season in which CSKA used equipment of the Italian company Kappa, from June 2012 the club has new kit supplier, Italian company Legea. The team used the new equipment for the first time in the pre-season friendly against Moscow side Torpedo Moscow, ended 1–2. The kits were sample and they were with a different outfit and a different spot where the team badge was placed. The official presentation of the new kits was before the friendly match against Macedonian side Drita on 14 July 2012 (2–0), played at the Bulgarian Army Stadium.

== Club anthem ==
The official anthem of CSKA Sofia is the song "Sartsa cherveni" ("Red hearts") by the famous Bulgarian singer Yordanka Hristova. The song is written in 1999 by composer Evgeni Dimitrov and lyricist Ivaylo Valchev, authors of many of the hits of Slavi Trifonov and Ku-Ku Band.
