= Tsvetomir Valeriev =

Bulgarian footballer

Personal information
- Date of birth: 16 August 1983 (age 43)
- Place of birth: Vratsa, Bulgaria
- Height: 1.82 m (5 ft 11 1/2 in)
- Position: Midfielder

Team information
- Current team: CSKA Sofia (Scout)

Youth career
- 1990–2005: Botev Vratsa

Senior career*
Years	Team	Apps	(Gls)
2005	Pomorie	9	(2)
2006–2007	Naftex Burgas	21	(0)
2007–2008	Lokomotiv Mezdra	28	(1)
2009	Naftex Burgas	11	(0)
2009	Sliven 2000	5	(0)
2010	Chernomorets Balchik	10	(2)
2011	Etar 1924	11	(0)
2011–2013	Lokomotiv Mezdra	44	(18)
2014	Botev Vratsa	15	(2)
2015–2016	Kaliakra Kavarna	?	(?)
2016	Tsarsko Selo	2	(0)

Managerial career
- 2017: Levski Sofia (Video Analyst)
- 2017–2018: Arda Kardzhali (Assistant)
- 2018–2019: CSKA 1948 (Assistant)
- 2018–2020: CSKA 1948 (Video Analyst)
- 2020: Pirin Blagoevgrad (Youth)
- 2021–2024: Slavia Sofia (Video Analyst)
- 2024–: CSKA Sofia (Scout)
- * Club domestic league appearances and goals

Tsvetomir Valeriev (Bulgarian: Цветомир Валериев; born 16 August 1983) is a former Bulgarian footballer, who currently works as an scout at CSKA Sofia.

== Career ==
Valeriev is a left-footed player and does not have any problems playing as a left-sided midfielder. He has good creative skills. In the winter of 2011 he went on trial with Kazakhstani club Caspiy, but eventually refused to sign because the club changed the salary figures.
