= Republican spartakiada =

Republican spartakiada or "Republican sport events" (Bulgarian: Републиканска спартакиада) was sport activities in People's Republic of Bulgaria.

== History ==
The name spartakiada originated from the name of Spartacus (in Bulgarian: Спартак, Spartak) was multiple sport event in Bulgaria during the communist period. Predecessor of these games were the people's sport events, which were conducted before 1945. The first Republican spartakiada was held on the occasion of the 10th anniversary of the October Revolution in Bulgaria. Compete to the best teams of all counties in Bulgaria in 8 different sports. the Second Republican spartakiada was held in 1963. The third Republican spartakiada was held in 1965/1966 Over 100,000 people participate in sports championship. The Sixth Republican spartakiada was conducted in 1984. Over 2,500,000 people participate in sports event. In the sports games includes 2,500 clubs for physical culture and sport.

== Sports companies in the Bulgarian districts ==
=== Tarnovski Okrag (Veliko Tarnovo Province) ===
In the village of Resen was built the first stadium in rural area. Ivan Pavlov from Tarnovo Balkan champion in athletics in 1972 are held in years relays "Liberator" and "Druzhba". Council to BSFS Veliko Tarnovo counts 53 members.
