= 2011–12 UEFA Europa League qualifying =

Sporting event

This article details the 2011–12 UEFA Europa League qualifying phase.

All times are CEST (UTC+02:00).

== Round and draw dates ==
All draws held at UEFA headquarters in Nyon, Switzerland.

Round	Draw date and time	First leg	Second leg
First qualifying round	20 June 2011 13:00	30 June 2011	7 July 2011
Second qualifying round	20 June 2011 13:00	14 July 2011	21 July 2011
Third qualifying round	15 July 2011 13:30	28 July 2011	4 August 2011
Play-off round	5 August 2011 13:30	18 August 2011	25 August 2011
Play-off round	5 August 2011 13:30	18 August 2011	25 August 2011

Matches may also be played on Tuesdays or Wednesdays instead of the regular Thursdays due to scheduling conflicts.

== Format ==
Each tie is played over two legs, with each team playing one leg at home. The team that has the higher aggregate score over the two legs progresses to the next round. In the event that aggregate scores finish level, the away goals rule is applied, i.e., the team that scored more goals away from home over the two legs progresses. If away goals are also equal, then thirty minutes of extra time are played, divided into two fifteen-minute halves. The away goals rule is again applied after extra time, i.e., if there are goals scored during extra time and the aggregate score is still level, the visiting team qualifies by virtue of more away goals scored. If no goals are scored during extra time, the tie is decided by penalty shootout.

In the draw for each round, teams are seeded based on their 2011 UEFA club coefficients, with the teams divided into seeded and unseeded pots. A seeded team is drawn against an unseeded team, with the order of legs in each tie decided randomly. Due to the limited time between matches, the draws for the second and third qualifying rounds take place before the results of the previous round are known. The seeding in each draw is carried out under the assumption that all of the highest-ranked clubs of the previous round are victorious. If a lower-ranked club is victorious, it simply takes the place of its defeated opponent in the next round. Prior to the draw, UEFA may form "groups" in accordance with the principles set by the Club Competitions Committee, but they are purely for convenience of the draw and do not resemble any real groupings in the sense of the competition, while ensuring that teams from the same association are not drawn against each other.

== Teams ==
Below are the 176 teams involved in the qualifying phase and play-off round, grouped by their starting rounds (including 15 losing teams from the Champions League third qualifying round which enter the play-off round). The 38 winners of the play-off round qualified for the group stage to join the 10 losing teams from the Champions League play-off round.

Key to colours
Qualified for the group stage

Play-off round
Team	Coeff
(Spain) Sevilla	93.465
(Italy) Roma	85.110
(England) Tottenham Hotspur	78.157
(Netherlands) PSV Eindhoven	74.025
(Portugal) Sporting CP	68.319
(Portugal) Braga	62.319
(Germany) Schalke 04	61.887
(Ukraine) Dynamo Kyiv	60.776
(Greece) Panathinaikos	57.833
(Scotland) Rangers	56.028
(Russia) Spartak Moscow	51.941
(France) Paris Saint-Germain	51.735
(Belgium) Anderlecht	42.400
(Scotland) Celtic	39.528
(Turkey) Beşiktaş	37.010
(Ukraine) Metalist Kharkiv	34.276
(Belgium) Standard Liège	32.400
(Greece) AEK Athens	30.833
(Romania) Steaua București	29.164
(Spain) Athletic Bilbao	24.465
(Italy) Lazio	23.110
(Norway) Rosenborg	19.375
(Russia) Lokomotiv Moscow	18.441
(England) Birmingham City	17.157
(Romania) Rapid București	16.164
(Serbia) Partizan	15.850
(Germany) Hannover 96	13.887
(France) Sochaux	12.735
(Ukraine) Dnipro Dnipropetrovsk	12.276
(Turkey) Trabzonspor	12.010
(Bulgaria) CSKA Sofia	10.575
(Romania) Vaslui	10.164
(Switzerland) Sion	9.480
(Bulgaria) Litex Lovech	8.575
(Denmark) Nordsjælland	7.110
(Slovakia) Slovan Bratislava	5.899
(Slovenia) Maribor	4.224
(Finland) HJK	3.793
(Lithuania) Ekranas	3.541
(Georgia (country)) Zestaponi	2.891
(Republic of Ireland) Shamrock Rovers	2.741

Third qualifying round
Team	Coeff
(Spain) Atlético Madrid	70.465
(Netherlands) AZ	43.025
(Israel) Hapoel Tel Aviv	36.400
(Belgium) Club Brugge	31.400
(Czech Republic) Sparta Prague	30.170
(Italy) Palermo	26.110
(Romania) Dinamo București	22.164
(Greece) PAOK	17.333
(England) Stoke City	17.157
(France) Rennes	16.735
(Switzerland) Young Boys	14.980
(Bulgaria) Levski Sofia	14.575
(Germany) Mainz 05	13.887
(Czech Republic) Mladá Boleslav	13.170
(Turkey) Bursaspor	12.010
(Portugal) Vitória de Guimarães	11.319
(Sweden) Helsingborgs IF	10.825
(Ukraine) Karpaty Lviv	10.776
(Denmark) Brøndby	10.110
(Serbia) Red Star Belgrade	9.350
(Russia) Alania Vladikavkaz	8.941
(Scotland) Heart of Midlothian	7.528
(Croatia) Hajduk Split	6.224
(Cyprus) Omonia	6.124
(Poland) Legia Warsaw	5.183
(Austria) Ried	4.140
(Belarus) Gomel	3.216
(Slovakia) Senica	2.899
(Norway) Strømsgodset	2.875
(Republic of Ireland) Sligo Rovers	1.991

Second qualifying round
Team	Coeff
(Austria) Red Bull Salzburg	22.140
Austria Wien	16.640
(Cyprus) Anorthosis	14.624
(Slovakia) Žilina	14.399
(Portugal) Nacional	14.319
(Ukraine) Vorskla Poltava	10.276
(Moldova) Sheriff Tiraspol	9.549
(Netherlands) ADO Den Haag	8.025
(Bulgaria) Lokomotiv Sofia	7.575
(Turkey) Gaziantepspor	7.010
(Greece) Olympiacos Volos	6.833
(Scotland) Dundee United	6.528
(Israel) Bnei Yehuda	6.400
(Denmark) Midtjylland	6.110
(Israel) Maccabi Tel Aviv	5.900
(Belgium) Westerlo	5.400
(Czech Republic) Jablonec	5.170
(Romania) Gaz Metan Mediaș	5.164
(Latvia) Ventspils	4.983
(Switzerland) Thun	4.980
(Norway) Vålerenga	4.875
(Kazakhstan) Aktobe	3.874
(Serbia) Vojvodina	3.850
(Republic of Ireland) Bohemians	3.741
(Cyprus) AEK Larnaca	3.624
(Bosnia and Herzegovina) Sarajevo	3.324
(Estonia) Levadia Tallinn	3.258
(Croatia) RNK Split	3.224
(Belarus) Shakhtyor Soligorsk	3.216
(Poland) Śląsk Wrocław	3.183
(Iceland) FH	2.991
(Latvia) Liepājas Metalurgs	2.983
(Sweden) Örebro SK	2.825
(Bosnia and Herzegovina) Željezničar	2.824
(Moldova) Iskra-Stal	2.549
(Lithuania) Sūduva	2.541
(Liechtenstein) Vaduz	2.300
(Finland) TPS	2.293
(Albania) Tirana	2.274
(Lithuania) Tauras Tauragė	2.041
(Finland) KuPS	1.793
(Montenegro) Rudar Pljevlja	1.775
(Hungary) Kecskemét	1.700
(Andorra) Sant Julià	1.700
(Faroe Islands) EB/Streymur	1.533
(Azerbaijan) Khazar Lankaran	1.483
(Georgia (country)) Gagra	1.391
(North Macedonia) Metalurg Skopje	1.291
(Luxembourg) Differdange 03	1.274
(Armenia) Mika	1.266
(Slovenia) Domžale	1.224
(Wales) Llanelli	1.058
(Northern Ireland) Crusaders	0.949
(San Marino) Juvenes/Dogana	0.683
(Malta) Floriana	0.483

First qualifying round
Team	Coeff
(England) Fulham	40.157
(Sweden) IF Elfsborg	8.825
(Norway) Tromsø	4.375
(Republic of Ireland) St Patrick's Athletic	4.241
(Azerbaijan) Qarabağ	4.233
(Poland) Jagiellonia Białystok	4.183
(North Macedonia) Rabotnicki	4.041
(Norway) Aalesund	3.875
(Slovakia) Spartak Trnava	3.399
(Georgia (country)) Dinamo Tbilisi	3.391
(Finland) Honka	3.293
(Croatia) Varaždin	3.224
(Belarus) Minsk	3.216
(Georgia (country)) Metalurgi Rustavi	2.891
(Serbia) Rad	2.850
(Sweden) BK Häcken	2.825
(Bosnia and Herzegovina) Široki Brijeg	2.824
(Montenegro) Budućnost Podgorica	2.525
(Iceland) KR	2.491
(Wales) The New Saints	2.308
(North Macedonia) Renova	2.291
(Slovenia) Koper	2.224
(Malta) Birkirkara	1.733
(Hungary) Ferencváros	1.700
(Hungary) Paks	1.700
(Northern Ireland) Glentoran	1.699
(Moldova) Milsami Orhei	1.549
(Lithuania) Banga	1.541
(Latvia) Daugava Daugavpils	1.483
(Slovenia) Olimpija Ljubljana	1.474
(Northern Ireland) Cliftonville	1.449
(Albania) Flamurtari	1.274
(Albania) Vllaznia	1.274
(Estonia) Narva Trans	1.258
(Azerbaijan) AZAL Baku	1.233
(Kazakhstan) Irtysh	1.124
(Kazakhstan) Shakhter Karagandy	1.124
(Montenegro) Zeta	1.025
(Armenia) Banants	1.016
(Estonia) Nõmme Kalju	1.008
(Iceland) ÍBV	0.991
(Faroe Islands) NSÍ	0.783
(Armenia) Ulisses	0.766
(San Marino) Tre Penne	0.683
(Wales) Neath	0.558
(Luxembourg) Käerjéng 97	0.524
(Andorra) Lusitanos	0.450
(Andorra) UE Santa Coloma	0.450
(Faroe Islands) ÍF	0.283
(Luxembourg) Fola Esch	0.274

Notes

1. ^{CL-CR} Losing teams from the Champions League third qualifying round (Champions Route)
2. ^{CL-LR} Losing teams from the Champions League third qualifying round (League Route)

== First qualifying round ==
=== Seeding ===
The draw for the first qualifying round was held on 20 June 2011.

Group 1		Group 2		Group 3	
Seeded	Unseeded	Seeded	Unseeded	Seeded	Unseeded
(Sweden) IF Elfsborg (Norway) Tromsø (Finland) Honka (Iceland) KR (Wales) The New Saints	(Latvia) Daugava Daugavpils (Northern Ireland) Cliftonville (Estonia) Nõmme Kalju (Faroe Islands) ÍF (Luxembourg) Fola Esch	(England) Fulham (Republic of Ireland) St Patrick's Athletic (Norway) Aalesund (Sweden) BK Häcken (North Macedonia) Renova	(Northern Ireland) Glentoran (Iceland) ÍBV (Faroe Islands) NSÍ (Wales) Neath (Luxembourg) Käerjéng 97	(Azerbaijan) Qarabağ (North Macedonia) Rabotnicki (Serbia) Rad (Slovenia) Koper (Hungary) Paks	(Lithuania) Banga (Estonia) Narva Trans (Kazakhstan) Shakhter Karagandy (San Marino) Tre Penne (Andorra) UE Santa Coloma
Group 4		Group 5			
Seeded	Unseeded	Seeded	Unseeded		
(Poland) Jagiellonia Białystok (Georgia (country)) Dinamo Tbilisi (Belarus) Minsk (Montenegro) Budućnost Podgorica (Hungary) Ferencváros	(Moldova) Milsami Orhei (Albania) Flamurtari (Azerbaijan) AZAL Baku (Kazakhstan) Irtysh (Armenia) Ulisses	(Slovakia) Spartak Trnava (Croatia) Varaždin (Georgia (country)) Metalurgi Rustavi (Bosnia and Herzegovina) Široki Brijeg (Malta) Birkirkara	(Slovenia) Olimpija Ljubljana (Albania) Vllaznia (Montenegro) Zeta (Armenia) Banants (Andorra) Lusitanos		

=== Summary ===
The first legs were played on 30 June, and the second legs were played on 7 July 2011.

Team 1	Agg.	Team 2	1st leg	2nd leg
ÍF (Faroe Islands)	2–8 (Note: Order of legs reversed after original draw.)	(Iceland) KR	1–3	1–5
Daugava Daugavpils (Latvia)	1–7	(Norway) Tromsø	0–5	1–2
IF Elfsborg (Sweden)	5–1	(Luxembourg) Fola Esch	4–0	1–1
The New Saints (Wales)	2–1	(Northern Ireland) Cliftonville	1–1	1–0
Honka (Finland)	2–0	(Estonia) Nõmme Kalju	0–0	2–0
Fulham (England)	3–0	(Faroe Islands) NSÍ	3–0	0–0
ÍBV (Iceland)	1–2	(Republic of Ireland) St Patrick's Athletic	1–0	0–2
Käerjéng 97 (Luxembourg)	2–6	(Sweden) BK Häcken	1–1	1–5
Aalesund (Norway)	6–1	(Wales) Neath	4–1	2–0
Renova (North Macedonia)	3–3 (2–3 p)	(Northern Ireland) Glentoran	2–1	1–2 (a.e.t.)
Koper (Slovenia)	2–3	(Kazakhstan) Shakhter Karagandy	1–1	1–2
Banga (Lithuania)	0–7	(Azerbaijan) Qarabağ	0–4	0–3
UE Santa Coloma (Andorra)	0–5	(Hungary) Paks	0–1	0–4
Narva Trans (Estonia)	1–7	(North Macedonia) Rabotnicki	1–4	0–3
Rad (Serbia)	9–1	(San Marino) Tre Penne	6–0	3–1
Budućnost Podgorica (Montenegro)	3–4	(Albania) Flamurtari	1–3	2–1
Ferencváros (Hungary)	5–0	(Armenia) Ulisses	3–0	2–0
Jagiellonia Białystok (Poland)	1–2	(Kazakhstan) Irtysh	1–0	0–2
AZAL Baku (Azerbaijan)	2–3	(Belarus) Minsk	1–1	1–2
Dinamo Tbilisi (Georgia (country))	5–1	(Moldova) Milsami Orhei	2–0	3–1
Varaždin (Croatia)	6–1	(Andorra) Lusitanos	5–1	1–0
Banants (Armenia)	1–2	(Georgia (country)) Metalurgi Rustavi	0–1	1–1
Birkirkara (Malta)	1–2	(Albania) Vllaznia	0–1	1–1
Široki Brijeg (Bosnia and Herzegovina)	0–3	(Slovenia) Olimpija Ljubljana	0–0	0–3
Spartak Trnava (Slovakia)	4–2	(Montenegro) Zeta	3–0	1–2

== Second qualifying round ==
=== Seeding ===
The draw for the second qualifying round was held on 20 June 2011, immediately after the first qualifying round draw.

Group 1		Group 2		Group 3		Group 4	
Seeded	Unseeded	Seeded	Unseeded	Seeded	Unseeded	Seeded	Unseeded
(Moldova) Sheriff Tiraspol (Sweden) IF Elfsborg (Bulgaria) Lokomotiv Sofia (Israel) Bnei Yehuda (Kazakhstan) Irtysh	(Georgia (country)) Metalurgi Rustavi (Bosnia and Herzegovina) Željezničar (Lithuania) Sūduva (Andorra) Sant Julià (North Macedonia) Metalurg Skopje	(Ukraine) Vorskla Poltava (Netherlands) ADO Den Haag (Turkey) Gaziantepspor (Romania) Gaz Metan Mediaș (Croatia) Varaždin	(Belarus) Minsk (Moldova) Iskra-Stal (Northern Ireland) Glentoran (Lithuania) Tauras Tauragė (Finland) KuPS	(England) Fulham (North Macedonia) Rabotnicki (Cyprus) AEK Larnaca (Georgia (country)) Dinamo Tbilisi (Bosnia and Herzegovina) Sarajevo	(Sweden) Örebro SK (Wales) Llanelli (Northern Ireland) Crusaders (San Marino) Juvenes/Dogana (Malta) Floriana	(Slovakia) Žilina (Czech Republic) Jablonec (Latvia) Ventspils (Norway) Vålerenga (Republic of Ireland) Bohemians	(Belarus) Shakhtyor Soligorsk (Slovenia) Olimpija Ljubljana (Albania) Flamurtari (Iceland) KR (Armenia) Mika
Group 5		Group 6		Group 7		Group 8	
Seeded	Unseeded	Seeded	Unseeded	Seeded	Unseeded	Seeded	Unseeded
(Austria) Red Bull Salzburg (Norway) Aalesund (Slovakia) Spartak Trnava (Estonia) Levadia Tallinn (Croatia) RNK Split	(Latvia) Liepājas Metalurgs (Albania) Tirana (Hungary) Ferencváros (Luxembourg) Differdange 03 (Slovenia) Domžale	(Cyprus) Anorthosis Famagusta (Greece) Olympiacos Volos (Denmark) Midtjylland (Kazakhstan) Aktobe (Finland) Honka	(Serbia) Rad (Sweden) BK Häcken (Wales) The New Saints (Hungary) Kecskemét (Georgia (country)) Gagra	Austria Wien (Scotland) Dundee United (Republic of Ireland) St Patrick's Athletic (Azerbaijan) Qarabağ (Serbia) Vojvodina	(Poland) Śląsk Wrocław (Liechtenstein) Vaduz (Kazakhstan) Shakhter Karagandy (Montenegro) Rudar Pljevlja (Faroe Islands) EB/Streymur	(Portugal) Nacional (Israel) Maccabi Tel Aviv (Belgium) Westerlo (Switzerland) Thun (Norway) Tromsø	(Iceland) FH (Finland) TPS (Albania) Vllaznia (Hungary) Paks (Azerbaijan) Khazar Lankaran

Notes

1. ^{†} Winners of the previous round whose identity was not known at the time of the draw. Teams in italics defeated a team with a higher coefficient in the previous round, thus effectively taking the coefficient of their opponent in the draw for this round.

=== Summary ===
The first legs were played on 14 July, and the second legs were played on 21 July 2011.

Team 1	Agg.	Team 2	1st leg	2nd leg
Metalurgi Rustavi (Georgia (country))	3–1	(Kazakhstan) Irtysh	1–1	2–0
Sūduva (Lithuania)	1–4	(Sweden) IF Elfsborg	1–1	0–3
Metalurg Skopje (North Macedonia)	2–3	(Bulgaria) Lokomotiv Sofia	0–0	2–3
Sant Julià (Andorra)	0–4	(Israel) Bnei Yehuda	0–2	0–2
Željezničar (Bosnia and Herzegovina)	1–0	(Moldova) Sheriff Tiraspol	1–0	0–0
KuPS (Finland)	1–2	(Romania) Gaz Metan Mediaș	1–0	0–2
Minsk (Belarus)	2–5	(Turkey) Gaziantepspor	1–1	1–4
Iskra-Stal (Moldova)	2–4	(Croatia) Varaždin	1–1	1–3
Tauras Tauragė (Lithuania)	2–5	(Netherlands) ADO Den Haag	2–3	0–2
Glentoran (Northern Ireland)	0–5	(Ukraine) Vorskla Poltava	0–2	0–3
Juvenes/Dogana (San Marino)	0–4	(North Macedonia) Rabotnicki	0–1	0–3
Örebro SK (Sweden)	0–2	(Bosnia and Herzegovina) Sarajevo	0–0	0–2
Crusaders (Northern Ireland)	1–7	(England) Fulham	1–3	0–4
Llanelli (Wales)	2–6	(Georgia (country)) Dinamo Tbilisi	2–1	0–5
Floriana (Malta)	0–9	(Cyprus) AEK Larnaca	0–8	0–1
Shakhtyor Soligorsk (Belarus)	2–4	(Latvia) Ventspils	0–1	2–3
Flamurtari (Albania)	1–7	(Czech Republic) Jablonec	0–2	1–5
KR (Iceland)	3–2	(Slovakia) Žilina	3–0	0–2
Vålerenga (Norway)	2–0 (Note: Order of legs reversed after original draw.)	(Armenia) Mika	1–0	1–0
Olimpija Ljubljana (Slovenia)	3–1	(Republic of Ireland) Bohemians	2–0	1–1
Domžale (Slovenia)	2–5	(Croatia) RNK Split	1–2	1–3
Differdange 03 (Luxembourg)	1–0	(Estonia) Levadia Tallinn	0–0	1–0
Tirana (Albania)	1–3	(Slovakia) Spartak Trnava	0–0	1–3
Ferencváros (Hungary)	3–4	(Norway) Aalesund	2–1	1–3 (a.e.t.)
Liepājas Metalurgs (Latvia)	1–4	(Austria) Red Bull Salzburg	1–4	0–0
Rad (Serbia)	1–2	(Greece) Olympiacos Volos	0–1	1–1
The New Saints (Wales)	3–8	(Denmark) Midtjylland	1–3	2–5
Kecskemét (Hungary)	1–1 (a)	(Kazakhstan) Aktobe	1–1	0–0
BK Häcken (Sweden)	3–0	(Finland) Honka	1–0	2–0
Anorthosis Famagusta (Cyprus)	3–2	(Georgia (country)) Gagra	3–0	0–2
Vaduz (Liechtenstein)	3–3 (a)	(Serbia) Vojvodina	0–2	3–1
Rudar Pljevlja (Montenegro)	0–5	Austria Wien	0–3	0–2
Śląsk Wrocław (Poland)	3–3 (a)	(Scotland) Dundee United	1–0	2–3
Shakhter Karagandy (Kazakhstan)	2–3	(Republic of Ireland) St Patrick's Athletic	2–1	0–2
EB/Streymur (Faroe Islands)	1–1 (a)	(Azerbaijan) Qarabağ	1–1	0–0
FH (Iceland)	1–3	(Portugal) Nacional	1–1	0–2
Paks (Hungary)	4–1	(Norway) Tromsø	1–1	3–0
TPS (Finland)	0–1	(Belgium) Westerlo	0–1	0–0
Maccabi Tel Aviv (Israel)	3–1	(Azerbaijan) Khazar Lankaran	3–1	0–0
Vllaznia (Albania)	1–2	(Switzerland) Thun	0–0	1–2

== Third qualifying round ==
=== Seeding ===
The draw for the third qualifying round was held on 15 July 2011.

Group 1		Group 2		Group 3		Group 4	
Seeded	Unseeded	Seeded	Unseeded	Seeded	Unseeded	Seeded	Unseeded
(Spain) Atlético Madrid (Switzerland) Young Boys (Czech Republic) Mladá Boleslav (Serbia) Red Star Belgrade (Russia) Alania Vladikavkaz	(Belgium) Westerlo (Latvia) Ventspils (Kazakhstan) Aktobe (Cyprus) AEK Larnaca (Norway) Strømsgodset	(Netherlands) AZ; Austria Wien (Turkey) Bursaspor (Bosnia and Herzegovina) Željezničar (Sweden) IF Elfsborg	(Israel) Maccabi Tel Aviv (Czech Republic) Jablonec (Norway) Aalesund (Slovenia) Olimpija Ljubljana (Belarus) Gomel	(Israel) Hapoel Tel Aviv (France) Rennes (Bulgaria) Levski Sofia (Portugal) Vitória de Guimarães (Turkey) Gaziantepspor	(Denmark) Midtjylland (Poland) Legia Warsaw (Liechtenstein) Vaduz (Slovakia) Spartak Trnava (Georgia (country)) Metalurgi Rustavi	(Italy) Palermo (Romania) Dinamo București (Iceland) KR (Ukraine) Karpaty Lviv (Netherlands) ADO Den Haag	(Cyprus) Omonia (Switzerland) Thun (Republic of Ireland) St Patrick's Athletic (Georgia (country)) Dinamo Tbilisi (Croatia) Varaždin
Group 5		Group 6		Group 7			
Seeded	Unseeded	Seeded	Unseeded	Seeded	Unseeded		
(Belgium) Club Brugge (Austria) Red Bull Salzburg (Germany) Mainz 05 (Sweden) Helsingborgs IF (Greece) Olympiacos Volos	(Israel) Bnei Yehuda (Romania) Gaz Metan Mediaș (Azerbaijan) Qarabağ (Luxembourg) Differdange 03 (Slovakia) Senica	(Czech Republic) Sparta Prague (England) Stoke City (Cyprus) Anorthosis Famagusta (Ukraine) Vorskla Poltava (Scotland) Heart of Midlothian	(Croatia) Hajduk Split (Hungary) Paks (North Macedonia) Rabotnicki (Bosnia and Herzegovina) Sarajevo (Republic of Ireland) Sligo Rovers	(England) Fulham (Greece) PAOK (Portugal) Nacional (Denmark) Brøndby (Bulgaria) Lokomotiv Sofia	(Poland) Śląsk Wrocław (Norway) Vålerenga (Austria) Ried (Sweden) BK Häcken (Croatia) RNK Split		

Notes

1. ^{†} Winners of the previous round whose identity was not known at the time of the draw. Teams in italics defeated a team with a higher coefficient in the previous round, thus effectively taking the coefficient of their opponent in the draw for this round.

=== Summary ===
The first legs were played on 26 and 28 July, and the second legs were played on 4 August 2011.

Team 1	Agg.	Team 2	1st leg	2nd leg
Atlético Madrid (Spain)	4–1	(Norway) Strømsgodset	2–1	2–0
Young Boys (Switzerland)	5–1	(Belgium) Westerlo	3–1	2–0
Ventspils (Latvia)	1–9	(Serbia) Red Star Belgrade	1–2	0–7
Alania Vladikavkaz (Russia)	2–2 (4–2 p)	(Kazakhstan) Aktobe	1–1	1–1 (a.e.t.)
AEK Larnaca (Cyprus)	5–2	(Czech Republic) Mladá Boleslav	3–0	2–2
Željezničar (Bosnia and Herzegovina)	0–8	(Israel) Maccabi Tel Aviv	0–2	0–6
AZ (Netherlands)	3–1	(Czech Republic) Jablonec	2–0	1–1
Olimpija Ljubljana (Slovenia)	3–4	Austria Wien	1–1	2–3
Bursaspor (Turkey)	5–2	(Belarus) Gomel	2–1	3–1
Aalesund (Norway)	5–1	(Sweden) IF Elfsborg	4–0	1–1
Gaziantepspor (Turkey)	0–1	(Poland) Legia Warsaw	0–1	0–0
Hapoel Tel Aviv (Israel)	5–2	(Liechtenstein) Vaduz	4–0	1–2
Metalurgi Rustavi (Georgia (country))	2–7	(France) Rennes	2–5	0–2
Levski Sofia (Bulgaria)	3–3 (4–5 p)	(Slovakia) Spartak Trnava	2–1	1–2 (a.e.t.)
Midtjylland (Denmark)	1–2	(Portugal) Vitória de Guimarães	0–0	1–2
Dinamo București (Romania)	4–3	(Croatia) Varaždin	2–2	2–1
Karpaty Lviv (Ukraine)	5–1	(Republic of Ireland) St Patrick's Athletic	2–0	3–1
Palermo (Italy)	3–3 (a) (Note: Order of legs reversed after original draw.)	(Switzerland) Thun	2–2	1–1
KR (Iceland)	1–6	(Georgia (country)) Dinamo Tbilisi	1–4	0–2
Omonia (Cyprus)	3–1	(Netherlands) ADO Den Haag	3–0	0–1
Red Bull Salzburg (Austria)	4–0	(Slovakia) Senica	1–0	3–0
Club Brugge (Belgium)	4–2	(Azerbaijan) Qarabağ	4–1	0–1
Differdange 03 (Luxembourg)	w/o (Note: Greek club Olympiacos Volos, who had reached the play-off round, were excluded from the competition by UEFA on 11 August 2011 for their involvement in the Koriopolis match-fixing scandal. UEFA decided to replace them in the play-off round with Differdange 03 from Luxembourg, who had lost to Olympiacos Volos in the previous round.)	(Greece) Olympiacos Volos	0–3	0–3
Mainz 05 (Germany)	2–2 (3–4 p)	(Romania) Gaz Metan Mediaș	1–1	1–1 (a.e.t.)
Bnei Yehuda (Israel)	1–3	(Sweden) Helsingborgs IF	1–0	0–3
Stoke City (England)	2–0	(Croatia) Hajduk Split	1–0	1–0
Anorthosis Famagusta (Cyprus)	2–3	(North Macedonia) Rabotnicki	0–2	2–1
Sparta Prague (Czech Republic)	7–0	(Bosnia and Herzegovina) Sarajevo	5–0	2–0
Vorskla Poltava (Ukraine)	2–0	(Republic of Ireland) Sligo Rovers	0–0	2–0
Paks (Hungary)	2–5	(Scotland) Heart of Midlothian	1–1	1–4
Śląsk Wrocław (Poland)	0–0 (4–3 p)	(Bulgaria) Lokomotiv Sofia	0–0	0–0 (a.e.t.)
Nacional (Portugal)	4–2	(Sweden) BK Häcken	3–0	1–2
Ried (Austria)	4–4 (a)	(Denmark) Brøndby	2–0	2–4
Vålerenga (Norway)	0–5	(Greece) PAOK	0–2	0–3
RNK Split (Croatia)	0–2	(England) Fulham	0–0	0–2

== Play-off round ==
=== Seeding ===
The draw for the play-off round was held on 5 August 2011.

Group 1		Group 2		Group 3		Group 4	
Seeded	Unseeded	Seeded	Unseeded	Seeded	Unseeded	Seeded	Unseeded
(Spain) Atlético Madrid (Greece) Panathinaikos (Turkey) Beşiktaş (Ukraine) Metalist Kharkiv (Serbia) Partizan	(France) Sochaux (Portugal) Vitória de Guimarães (Russia) Alania Vladikavkaz (Israel) Maccabi Tel Aviv (Republic of Ireland) Shamrock Rovers	(Italy) Roma (France) Paris Saint-Germain (Belgium) Anderlecht (Romania) Dinamo București (Norway) Rosenborg	(Turkey) Bursaspor (Ukraine) Vorskla Poltava (Greece) ~~Olympiacos Volos~~ (Slovakia) Slovan Bratislava (Cyprus) AEK Larnaca	(England) Tottenham Hotspur (Russia) Spartak Moscow (Israel) Hapoel Tel Aviv (Spain) Athletic Bilbao (Greece) PAOK	(Turkey) Trabzonspor (Ukraine) Karpaty Lviv (Scotland) Heart of Midlothian (Poland) Legia Warsaw (Lithuania) Ekranas	(Portugal) Sporting CP (Scotland) Rangers (England) Fulham (Romania) Steaua București (Russia) Lokomotiv Moscow	(Ukraine) Dnipro Dnipropetrovsk (Bulgaria) CSKA Sofia (Denmark) Nordsjælland (Slovenia) Maribor (Slovakia) Spartak Trnava
Group 5		Group 6		Group 7			
Seeded	Unseeded	Seeded	Unseeded	Seeded	Unseeded		
(Netherlands) PSV Eindhoven (Ukraine) Dynamo Kyiv (Scotland) Celtic (Italy) Lazio (England) Birmingham City (Romania) Rapid București	(Portugal) Nacional (Switzerland) Sion (Bulgaria) Litex Lovech (Austria) Ried (North Macedonia) Rabotnicki (Poland) Śląsk Wrocław	(Spain) Sevilla (Netherlands) AZ (Belgium) Club Brugge (Czech Republic) Sparta Prague (Austria) Red Bull Salzburg (England) Stoke City	(Germany) Hannover 96 (Romania) Vaslui (Cyprus) Omonia (Switzerland) Thun (Norway) Aalesund (Georgia (country)) Zestaponi	(Portugal) Braga (Germany) Schalke 04 (Belgium) Standard Liège (Greece) AEK Athens (France) Rennes; Austria Wien	(Switzerland) Young Boys (Sweden) Helsingborgs IF (Serbia) Red Star Belgrade (Romania) Gaz Metan Mediaș (Finland) HJK (Georgia (country)) Dinamo Tbilisi		

Notes

1. ^{&} Greek club Olympiacos Volos, who had reached the play-off round, were excluded from the competition by UEFA on 11 August 2011 for their involvement in the Koriopolis match-fixing scandal. UEFA decided to replace them in the play-off round with Differdange 03 from Luxembourg, who had lost to Olympiakos Volos in the previous round.

=== Summary ===
The first legs were played on 18 August, and the second legs were played on 25 August 2011.

Team 1	Agg.	Team 2	1st leg	2nd leg
Maccabi Tel Aviv (Israel)	4–2	(Greece) Panathinaikos	3–0	1–2
Atlético Madrid (Spain)	6–0	(Portugal) Vitória de Guimarães	2–0	4–0
Shamrock Rovers (Republic of Ireland)	3–2	(Serbia) Partizan	1–1	2–1 (a.e.t.)
Metalist Kharkiv (Ukraine)	4–0	(France) Sochaux	0–0	4–0
Beşiktaş (Turkey)	3–2	(Russia) Alania Vladikavkaz	3–0	0–2
Rosenborg (Norway)	1–2	(Cyprus) AEK Larnaca	0–0	1–2
Vorskla Poltava (Ukraine)	5–3	(Romania) Dinamo București	2–1	3–2
Bursaspor (Turkey)	3–4	(Belgium) Anderlecht	1–2	2–2
Slovan Bratislava (Slovakia)	2–1 (Note: Order of legs reversed after original draw.)	(Italy) Roma	1–0	1–1
Differdange 03 (Luxembourg)	0–6	(France) Paris Saint-Germain	0–4	0–2
Legia Warsaw (Poland)	5–4	(Russia) Spartak Moscow	2–2	3–2
Ekranas (Lithuania)	1–4	(Israel) Hapoel Tel Aviv	1–0	0–4
PAOK (Greece)	3–1	(Ukraine) Karpaty Lviv	2–0	1–1
Athletic Bilbao (Spain)	w/o (Note: Order of legs reversed after original draw. Also, as a result of match-fixing allegations, Turkish club Fenerbahçe were removed from the 2011–12 UEFA Champions League and were replaced with Trabzonspor on 24 August 2011. As a result, Trabzonspor's second leg against Athletic Bilbao was cancelled, and Athletic Bilbao qualified for the group stage.)	(Turkey) Trabzonspor	0–0	Canc.
Heart of Midlothian (Scotland)	0–5	(England) Tottenham Hotspur	0–5	0–0
Maribor (Slovenia)	3–2	(Scotland) Rangers	2–1	1–1
Steaua București (Romania)	3–1	(Bulgaria) CSKA Sofia	2–0	1–1
Nordsjælland (Denmark)	1–2	(Portugal) Sporting CP	0–0	1–2
Fulham (England)	3–1	(Ukraine) Dnipro Dnipropetrovsk	3–0	0–1
Lokomotiv Moscow (Russia)	3–1	(Slovakia) Spartak Trnava	2–0	1–1
Celtic (Scotland)	6–0 (Note: Order of legs reversed after original draw. Also, Celtic lodged protests over the eligibility of a number of the Sion players who participated in the two legs of the play-off round, which Sion won 3–1 aggregate (first leg: 0–0; second leg: 3–1). The UEFA Control and Disciplinary Body accepted the protests and decided to award both matches to Celtic by forfeit (3–0). As a consequence, Celtic qualified for the UEFA Europa League group stage.)	(Switzerland) Sion	3–0	3–0
Śląsk Wrocław (Poland)	2–4	(Romania) Rapid București	1–3	1–1
Litex Lovech (Bulgaria)	1–3	(Ukraine) Dynamo Kyiv	1–2	0–1
Lazio (Italy)	9–1	(North Macedonia) Rabotnicki	6–0	3–1
Nacional (Portugal)	0–3	(England) Birmingham City	0–0	0–3
Ried (Austria)	0–5	(Netherlands) PSV Eindhoven	0–0	0–5
Thun (Switzerland)	1–5	(England) Stoke City	0–1	1–4
Aalesund (Norway)	2–7	(Netherlands) AZ	2–1	0–6
Vaslui (Romania)	2–1	(Czech Republic) Sparta Prague	2–0	0–1
Omonia (Cyprus)	2–2 (a)	(Austria) Red Bull Salzburg	2–1	0–1
Zestaponi (Georgia (country))	3–5	(Belgium) Club Brugge	3–3	0–2
Hannover 96 (Germany)	3–2	(Spain) Sevilla	2–1	1–1
HJK (Finland)	3–6	(Germany) Schalke 04	2–0	1–6
AEK Athens (Greece)	2–1	(Georgia (country)) Dinamo Tbilisi	1–0	1–1 (a.e.t.)
Red Star Belgrade (Serbia)	1–6	(France) Rennes	1–2	0–4
Austria Wien	3–2	(Romania) Gaz Metan Mediaș	3–1	0–1
Braga (Portugal)	2–2 (a)	(Switzerland) Young Boys	0–0	2–2
Standard Liège (Belgium)	4–1	(Sweden) Helsingborgs IF	1–0	3–1
