= 2011–12 UEFA Europa League =

41st season of Europe's secondary club football tournament organised by UEFA

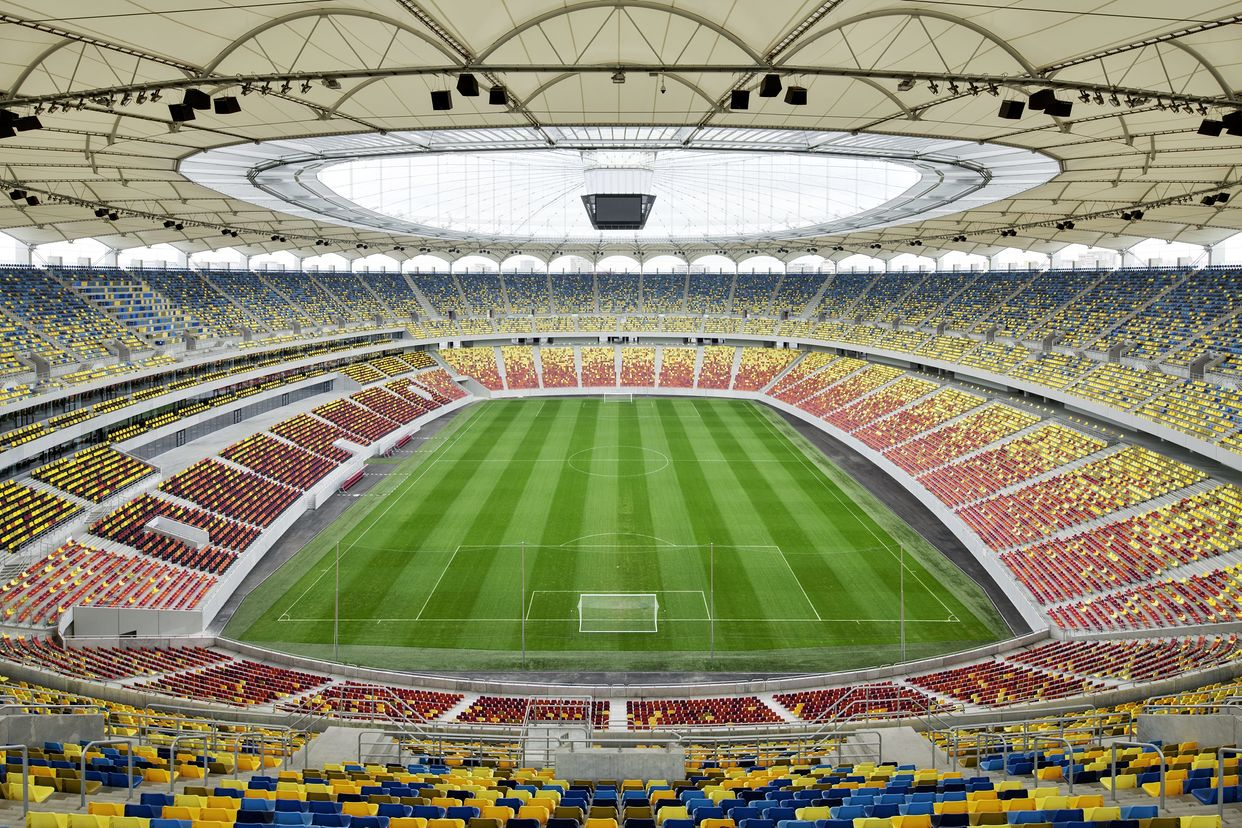
- The Arena Națională in Bucharest hosted the final

Tournament details
- Dates: 30 June – 25 August 2011 (qualifying); 15 September 2011 – 9 May 2012 (competition proper)
- Teams: 48+8 (competition proper); 161+33 (total) (from 53 associations)

Final positions
- Champions: (Spain) Atlético Madrid (2nd title)
- Runners-up: (Spain) Athletic Bilbao

Tournament statistics
- Matches played: 205
- Goals scored: 585 (2.85 per match)
- Top scorer(s): Radamel Falcao (Atlético Madrid); 12 goals

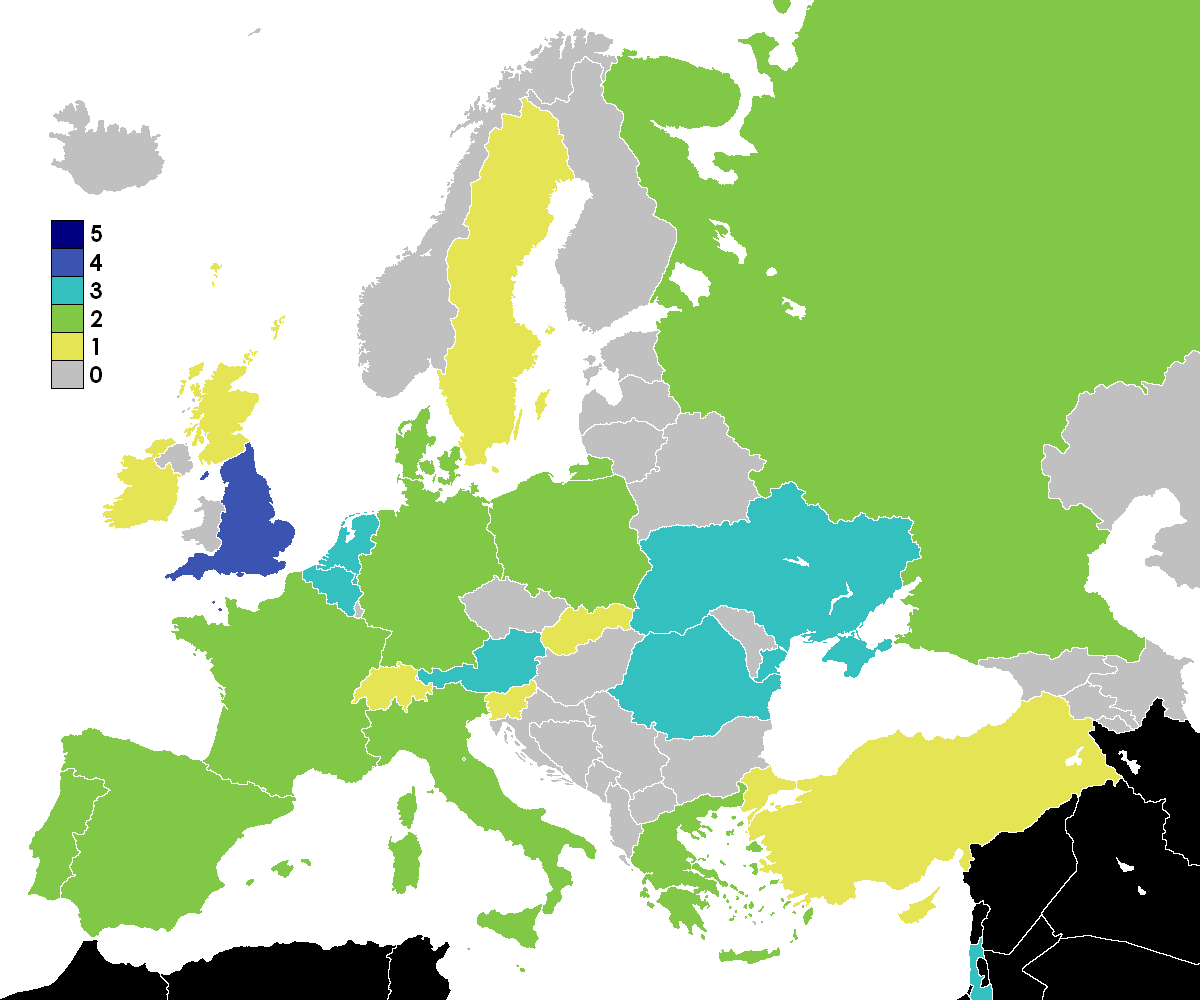
Teams by country in 2011–12 UEFA Europa League group stage

The 2011–12 UEFA Europa League was the third season of the UEFA Europa League, Europe's secondary club football tournament organised by UEFA, and the 41st edition overall including its predecessor, the UEFA Cup. It began on 30 June 2011 with the first legs of the first qualifying round, and ended on 9 May 2012 with the final held at Arena Națională in Bucharest, Romania. As part of a trial that started in the 2009–10 UEFA Europa League, two extra officials – one on each goal line – were used in all matches of the competition from the group stage.

Atlético Madrid won the title, defeating Athletic Bilbao 3–0 in an all-Spanish final (two goals from Falcao and one from Diego). Porto were the defending champions; they were beaten by Manchester City in the Round of 32 (6-1 on aggregate).

== Association team allocation ==
A total of 194 teams from 53 UEFA associations participated in the 2011–12 UEFA Europa League. Associations are allocated places according to their 2010 UEFA country coefficients, which takes into account their performance in European competitions from 2005–06 to 2009–10.

Below is the qualification scheme for the 2011–12 UEFA Europa League:

- Associations 1–6 each have three teams qualify
- Associations 7–9 each have four teams qualify
- Associations 10–51 each have three teams qualify, except Liechtenstein, which have one team qualify (as Liechtenstein only have a domestic cup and no domestic league)
- Associations 52–53 each have two teams qualify
- The top three associations of the 2010–11 UEFA Fair Play ranking each gain an additional berth
- Moreover, 33 teams eliminated from the 2011–12 UEFA Champions League are transferred to the Europa League

=== Association ranking ===
Rank	Association	Coeff.	Teams	Notes
1	England	81.856	3	+1(FP) +2(UCL)
2	Spain	79.757	3	+1(UCL)
3	Italy	64.338	3	+1(UCL)
4	Germany	64.207	3	
5	France	53.740	3	
6	Russia	43.791	3	+1(UCL)
7	Ukraine	39.550	4	+1(UCL)
8	Romania	39.491	4	+1(UCL)
9	Portugal	38.296	4	+1(UCL)
10	Netherlands	36.546	3	+2(UCL)
11	Turkey	34.450	3	+2(UCL)
12	Greece	29.899	3	+2(UCL)
13	Switzerland	28.375	3	+1(UCL)
14	Belgium	27.900	3	+1(UCL)
15	Denmark	27.350	3	+2(UCL)
16	Scotland	25.791	3	+1(UCL)
17	Bulgaria	22.000	3	+1(UCL)
18	Czech Republic	21.975	3	+1(UCL)

Rank	Association	Coeff.	Teams	Notes
19	Austria	19.575	3	+1(UCL)
20	Israel	18.875	3	+1(UCL)
21	Cyprus	17.999	3	
22	Norway	17.400	3	+1(FP) +1(UCL)
23	Slovakia	15.832	3	+1(UCL)
24	Sweden	14.191	3	+1(FP) +1(UCL)
25	Serbia	14.000	3	+1(UCL)
26	Poland	12.541	3	+1(UCL)
27	Croatia	12.332	3	
28	Belarus	11.541	3	
29	Republic of Ireland	9.541	3	+1(UCL)
30	Finland	9.499	3	+1(UCL)
31	Bosnia and Herzegovina	8.749	3	
32	Lithuania	8.416	3	+1(UCL)
33	Latvia	8.248	3	
34	Moldova	7.290	3	
35	Slovenia	6.957	3	+1(UCL)
36	Hungary	6.750	3	

Rank	Association	Coeff.	Teams	Notes
37	Georgia	5.748	3	+1(UCL)
38	Azerbaijan	5.498	3	
39	Iceland	5.415	3	
40	Macedonia	5.332	3	
41	Liechtenstein	4.500	1	
42	Kazakhstan	4.499	3	
43	Estonia	4.374	3	
44	Albania	3.999	3	
45	Armenia	2.999	3	
46	Wales	2.581	3	
47	Montenegro	2.125	3	
48	Faroe Islands	1.832	3	
49	Northern Ireland	1.624	3	
50	Luxembourg	1.249	3	
51	Andorra	1.000	3	
52	Malta	0.916	2	
53	San Marino	0.750	2	

Notes

- (FP): Additional fair play berth (Norway, England, Sweden)
- (UCL): Additional teams transferred from the UEFA Champions League

=== Distribution ===
Since the winners of the 2010–11 UEFA Europa League, Porto, qualified for the 2011–12 UEFA Champions League through domestic performance, the title holder spot reserved for them in the group stage was vacated. As a result, the following changes to the default allocation system were made to compensate for the vacant title holder spot in the group stage:

- The domestic cup winners of associations 16 and 17 (Scotland and Bulgaria) were promoted from the third qualifying round to the play-off round.
- The domestic cup winners of associations 28 and 29 (Belarus and Republic of Ireland) were promoted from the second qualifying round to the third qualifying round.
- The domestic cup winners of associations 52 and 53 (Malta and San Marino) and the domestic league runners-up of associations 33 and 34 (Latvia and Moldova) were promoted from the first qualifying round to the second qualifying round.

	Teams entering in this round	Teams advancing from previous round	Teams transferred from Champions League
First qualifying round (50 teams)	18 domestic league runners-up from associations 35–53 (except Liechtenstein); 29 domestic league third-placed teams from associations 22–51 (except Liechtenstein); 3 teams which qualified via Fair Play rankings		
Second qualifying round (80 teams)	24 domestic cup winners from associations 30–53; 16 domestic league runners-up from associations 19–34; 6 domestic league third-placed teams from associations 16–21; 6 domestic league fourth-placed teams from associations 10–15; 3 domestic league fifth-placed teams from associations 7–9	25 winners from the first qualifying round	
Third qualifying round (70 teams)	12 domestic cup winners from associations 18–29; 3 domestic league runners-up from associations 16–18; 6 domestic league third-placed teams from associations 10–15; 3 domestic league fourth-placed teams from associations 7–9; 3 domestic league fifth-placed teams from associations 4–6 (League Cup winners for France); 3 domestic league sixth-placed teams from associations 1–3 (League Cup winners for England)	40 winners from the second qualifying round	
Play-off round (76 teams)	17 domestic cup winners from associations 1–17; 3 domestic league third-placed teams from associations 7–9; 3 domestic league fourth-placed teams from associations 4–6; 3 domestic league fifth-placed teams from associations 1–3	35 winners from the third qualifying round	15 losers from the Champions League third qualifying round
Group stage (48 teams)		38 winners from the play-off round	10 losers from the Champions League play-off round
Knockout phase (32 teams)		12 group winners from the group stage; 12 group runners-up from the group stage	8 third-placed teams from the Champions League group stage

=== Redistribution rules ===
A Europa League place is vacated when a team qualifies for both the Champions League and the Europa League, or qualifies for the Europa League by more than one method. When a place is vacated, it is redistributed within the national association by the following rules:

- When the domestic cup winners (considered as the "highest-placed" qualifiers within the national association) also qualify for the Champions League, their Europa League place is vacated, and the remaining Europa League qualifiers are moved up one place, with the final place (with the earliest starting round) taken by the domestic cup runners-up, provided they do not already qualify for the Champions League or the Europa League. Otherwise, this place is taken by the highest-placed league finishers that have not yet qualified for the Europa League.
- When the domestic cup winners also qualify for the Europa League through league position, their place through the league position is vacated, and the Europa League qualifiers that finish lower in the league are moved up one place, with the final place taken by the highest-placed league finishers that have not yet qualified for the Europa League.
- A place vacated by the League Cup winners is taken by the highest-placed league finishers that have not yet qualified for the Europa League.
- A Fair Play place is taken by the highest-ranked team in the domestic Fair Play table that has not yet qualified for the Champions League or the Europa League.

=== Teams ===
The labels in the parentheses show how each team qualified for the place of its starting round:

- TH: Title holders
- CW: Cup winners
- CR: Cup runners-up
- LC: League Cup winners
- Nth: League position
- P-W: End-of-season European competition play-offs winners
- FP: Fair play
- UCL: Relegated from the Champions League
  - GS: Third-placed teams from the group stage
  - PO: Losers from the play-off round
  - Q3: Losers from the third qualifying round

Round of 32
(England) Manchester City (UCL GS)	(Turkey) Trabzonspor (UCL GS)	(England) Manchester United (UCL GS)	(Netherlands) Ajax (UCL GS)
(Spain) Valencia (UCL GS)	(Greece) Olympiacos (UCL GS)	(Portugal) Porto (UCL GS)^{TH}	(Czech Republic) Viktoria Plzeň (UCL GS)
Group stage
(Switzerland) Zürich (UCL PO)	(Denmark) Odense (UCL PO)	(Israel) Maccabi Haifa (UCL PO)	(Poland) Wisła Kraków (UCL PO)
(Sweden) Malmö FF (UCL PO)	(Russia) Rubin Kazan (UCL PO)	(Denmark) Copenhagen (UCL PO)	(Netherlands) Twente (UCL PO)
(Italy) Udinese (UCL PO)	(Austria) Sturm Graz (UCL PO)		
Play-off round
(England) Tottenham Hotspur (5th)	(Russia) Lokomotiv Moscow (5th)	(Belgium) Anderlecht (3rd)	(Belgium) Standard Liège (UCL Q3)
(England) Birmingham City (LC)	(Ukraine) Metalist Kharkiv (3rd)	(Denmark) Nordsjælland (CW)	(Slovakia) Slovan Bratislava (UCL Q3)
(Spain) Sevilla (5th)	(Ukraine) Dnipro Dnipropetrovsk (4th)	(Scotland) Celtic (CW)	(Georgia (country)) Zestaponi (UCL Q3)
(Spain) Athletic Bilbao (6th)	(Romania) Steaua București (CW)	(Bulgaria) CSKA Sofia (CW)	(Bulgaria) Litex Lovech (UCL Q3)
(Italy) Lazio (5th)	(Romania) Rapid București (4th)	(Lithuania) Ekranas (UCL Q3)	(Turkey) Trabzonspor (UCL Q3)
(Italy) Roma (6th)	(Portugal) Sporting CP (3rd)	(Republic of Ireland) Shamrock Rovers (UCL Q3)	(Serbia) Partizan (UCL Q3)
(Germany) Schalke 04 (CW)	(Portugal) Braga (4th)	(Greece) Panathinaikos (UCL Q3)	(Slovenia) Maribor (UCL Q3)
(Germany) Hannover 96 (4th)	(Netherlands) PSV Eindhoven (3rd)	(Ukraine) Dynamo Kyiv (UCL Q3)	(Finland) HJK (UCL Q3)
(France) Paris Saint-Germain (4th)	(Turkey) Beşiktaş (CW)	(Scotland) Rangers (UCL Q3)	
(France) Sochaux (5th)	(Greece) AEK Athens (CW)	(Romania) Vaslui (UCL Q3)	
(Russia) Spartak Moscow (4th)	(Switzerland) Sion (CW)	(Norway) Rosenborg (UCL Q3)	
Third qualifying round
(England) Stoke City (CR)	(Portugal) Vitória de Guimarães (5th)	(Bulgaria) Levski Sofia (2nd)	(Sweden) Helsingborgs IF (CW)
(Spain) Atlético Madrid (7th)	(Netherlands) AZ (4th)	(Czech Republic) Mladá Boleslav (CW)	(Serbia) Red Star Belgrade (2nd)
(Italy) Palermo (CR)	(Turkey) Bursaspor (3rd)	(Czech Republic) Sparta Prague (2nd)	(Poland) Legia Warsaw (CW)
(Germany) Mainz 05 (5th)	(Greece) PAOK (3rd)	(Austria) Ried (CW)	(Croatia) Hajduk Split (2nd)
(France) Rennes (6th)	(Switzerland) Young Boys (3rd)	(Israel) Hapoel Tel Aviv (CW)	(Belarus) Gomel (CW)
(Russia) Alania Vladikavkaz (CR)	(Belgium) Club Brugge (4th)	(Cyprus) Omonia (CW)	(Republic of Ireland) Sligo Rovers (CW)
(Ukraine) Karpaty Lviv (5th)	(Denmark) Brøndby (3rd)	(Norway) Strømsgodset (CW)	
(Romania) Dinamo București (6th)	(Scotland) Heart of Midlothian (3rd)	(Slovakia) Senica (2nd)	
Second qualifying round
(Ukraine) Vorskla Poltava (6th)	(Israel) Maccabi Tel Aviv (3rd)	(Bosnia and Herzegovina) Željezničar (CW)	(Liechtenstein) Vaduz (CW)
(Romania) Gaz Metan Mediaș (7th)	(Israel) Bnei Yehuda (4th)	(Bosnia and Herzegovina) Sarajevo (2nd)	(Kazakhstan) Aktobe (2nd)
(Portugal) Nacional (6th)	(Cyprus) Anorthosis Famagusta (3rd)	(Lithuania) Sūduva (2nd)	(Estonia) Levadia Tallinn (2nd)
(Netherlands) ADO Den Haag (P-W)	(Cyprus) AEK Larnaca (4th)	(Lithuania) Tauras Tauragė (4th)	(Albania) Tirana (CW)
(Turkey) Gaziantepspor (4th)	(Norway) Vålerenga (2nd)	(Latvia) Ventspils (CW)	(Armenia) Mika (CW)
(Greece) Olympiacos Volos (5th)	(Slovakia) Žilina (3rd)	(Latvia) Liepājas Metalurgs (3rd)	(Wales) Llanelli (CW)
(Switzerland) Thun (5th)	(Sweden) Örebro SK (3rd)	(Moldova) Iskra-Stal (CW)	(Montenegro) Rudar Pljevlja (CW)
(Belgium) Westerlo (CR)	(Serbia) Vojvodina (3rd)	(Moldova) Sheriff Tiraspol (2nd)	(Faroe Islands) EB/Streymur (CW)
(Denmark) Midtjylland (4th)	(Poland) Śląsk Wrocław (2nd)	(Slovenia) Domžale (CW)	(Northern Ireland) Crusaders (2nd)
(Scotland) Dundee United (4th)	(Croatia) RNK Split (3rd)	(Hungary) Kecskemét (CW)	(Luxembourg) Differdange 03 (CW)
(Bulgaria) Lokomotiv Sofia (4th)	(Belarus) Shakhtyor Soligorsk (2nd)	(Georgia (country)) Gagra (CW)	(Andorra) Sant Julià (CW)
(Czech Republic) Jablonec (3rd)	(Republic of Ireland) Bohemians (2nd)	(Azerbaijan) Khazar Lankaran (CW)	(Malta) Floriana (CW)
(Austria) Red Bull Salzburg (2nd)	(Finland) TPS (CW)	(Iceland) FH (CW)	(San Marino) Juvenes/Dogana (CW)
Austria Wien (3rd)	(Finland) KuPS (2nd)	(North Macedonia) Metalurg Skopje (CW)	
First qualifying round
(Norway) Tromsø (3rd)	(Slovenia) Koper (3rd)	(Kazakhstan) Shakhter Karagandy (CR)	(Northern Ireland) Glentoran (3rd)
(Slovakia) Spartak Trnava (4th)	(Slovenia) Olimpija Ljubljana (4th)	(Estonia) Narva Trans (3rd)	(Northern Ireland) Cliftonville (4th)
(Sweden) IF Elfsborg (4th)	(Hungary) Paks (2nd)	(Estonia) Nõmme Kalju (4th)	(Luxembourg) Fola Esch (2nd)
(Serbia) Rad (4th)	(Hungary) Ferencváros (3rd)	(Albania) Flamurtari (2nd)	(Luxembourg) Käerjéng 97 (3rd)
(Poland) Jagiellonia Białystok (4th)	(Georgia (country)) Dinamo Tbilisi (2nd)	(Albania) Vllaznia (3rd)	(Andorra) Lusitanos (3rd)
(Croatia) Varaždin (CR)	(Georgia (country)) Metalurgi Rustavi (3rd)	(Armenia) Banants (2nd)	(Andorra) UE Santa Coloma (4th)
(Belarus) Minsk (3rd)	(Azerbaijan) Qarabağ (3rd)	(Armenia) Ulisses (3rd)	(Malta) Birkirkara (3rd)
(Republic of Ireland) St Patrick's Athletic (5th)	(Azerbaijan) AZAL Baku (4th)	(Wales) The New Saints (2nd)	(San Marino) Tre Penne (2nd)
(Finland) Honka (4th)	(Iceland) ÍBV (3rd)	(Wales) Neath (P-W)	(Norway) Aalesund (FP)
(Bosnia and Herzegovina) Široki Brijeg (4th)	(Iceland) KR (4th)	(Montenegro) Budućnost Podgorica (2nd)	(England) Fulham (FP)
(Lithuania) Banga (CR)	(North Macedonia) Renova (3rd)	(Montenegro) Zeta (4th)	(Sweden) BK Häcken (FP)
(Latvia) Daugava Daugavpils (4th)	(North Macedonia) Rabotnicki (4th)	(Faroe Islands) NSÍ (3rd)	
(Moldova) Milsami Orhei (3rd)	(Kazakhstan) Irtysh (3rd)	(Faroe Islands) ÍF (4th)	

1. Republic of Ireland (IRL): Because Sporting Fingal, the fourth-placed team of the 2010 League of Ireland Premier Division, returned its domestic licence prior to the start of the 2011 season, St Patricks Athletic, the fifth-placed team of the league, claimed the Europa League spot in the first qualifying round.
2. Kazakhstan (KAZ): Because Lokomotiv Astana, the winners of the 2010 Kazakhstan Cup, did not exist for at least three years and could not obtain a UEFA licence, the second-placed team of the league, Aktobe, moved up to enter the second qualifying round, and the cup runners-up, Shakhter Karagandy, claimed the vacant Europa League spot in the first qualifying round.
3. Lithuania (LTU): Because Žalgiris, the third-placed team of the 2010 A Lyga, did not obtain a UEFA licence for the 2011–12 European competitions, Tauras Tauragė, the fourth-placed team of the league, claimed the Europa League spot in the second qualifying round.
4. Romania (ROU): Because Politehnica Timișoara, the 2010–11 Liga I runners-up, were denied a domestic licence for the 2011–12 season, Vaslui, the third-placed team of the league, claimed the Champions League spot in the third qualifying round for non-champions, instead of entering the Europa League play-off round. Subsequently, Rapid București and Dinamo București, the fourth- and sixth-placed teams of the league, moved up to enter the play-off round and the third qualifying round respectively, and Gaz Metan Mediaș, the seventh-placed team of the league, claimed the vacant Europa League spot in the second qualifying round.
5. Turkey (TUR): Fenerbahçe, the 2010–11 Süper Lig champions, was banned by the Turkish Football Federation on 24 August 2011 from participating in the 2011–12 UEFA Champions League due to the ongoing investigation into match-fixing. UEFA decided to replace them in the 2011–12 UEFA Champions League with Trabzonspor, the league runners-up, who had lost in the Champions League third qualifying round and were participating in the Europa League play-off round at that time. They finished third in their group and thus advanced to the 2011–12 UEFA Europa League knockout phase.

== Round and draw dates ==
All draws held at UEFA headquarters in Nyon, Switzerland unless stated otherwise.

Phase	Round	Draw date	First leg	Second leg
Qualifying	First qualifying round	20 June 2011	30 June 2011	7 July 2011
Qualifying	Second qualifying round	20 June 2011	14 July 2011	21 July 2011
Qualifying	Third qualifying round	15 July 2011	28 July 2011	4 August 2011
Play-off	Play-off round	5 August 2011	18 August 2011	25 August 2011
Group stage	Matchday 1	26 August 2011 (Monaco)	15 September 2011	
Group stage	Matchday 2	26 August 2011 (Monaco)	29 September 2011	
Group stage	Matchday 3	26 August 2011 (Monaco)	20 October 2011	
Group stage	Matchday 4	26 August 2011 (Monaco)	3 November 2011	
Group stage	Matchday 5	26 August 2011 (Monaco)	30 November – 1 December 2011	
Group stage	Matchday 6	26 August 2011 (Monaco)	14–15 December 2011	
Knockout phase	Round of 32	16 December 2011	16 February 2012	23 February 2012
Knockout phase	Round of 16	16 December 2011	8 March 2012	15 March 2012
Knockout phase	Quarter-finals	16 March 2012	29 March 2012	5 April 2012
Knockout phase	Semi-finals	16 March 2012	19 April 2012	26 April 2012
Knockout phase	Final	16 March 2012	9 May 2012 at Arena Națională, Bucharest	

Matches in the qualifying, play-off, and knockout rounds may also be played on Tuesdays or Wednesdays instead of the regular Thursdays due to scheduling conflicts.

== Qualifying rounds ==
In the qualifying rounds and the play-off round, teams were divided into seeded and unseeded teams based on their 2011 UEFA club coefficients, and then drawn into two-legged home-and-away ties. Teams from the same association cannot be drawn against each other.

=== First qualifying round ===
The draw for the first qualifying round was held on 20 June 2011. The first legs were played on 30 June, and the second legs were played on 7 July 2011.

Team 1	Agg.	Team 2	1st leg	2nd leg
ÍF (Faroe Islands)	2–8 (Note: Order of legs reversed after original draw.)	(Iceland) KR	1–3	1–5
Daugava Daugavpils (Latvia)	1–7	(Norway) Tromsø	0–5	1–2
IF Elfsborg (Sweden)	5–1	(Luxembourg) Fola Esch	4–0	1–1
The New Saints (Wales)	2–1	(Northern Ireland) Cliftonville	1–1	1–0
Honka (Finland)	2–0	(Estonia) Nõmme Kalju	0–0	2–0
Fulham (England)	3–0	(Faroe Islands) NSÍ	3–0	0–0
ÍBV (Iceland)	1–2	(Republic of Ireland) St Patrick's Athletic	1–0	0–2
Käerjéng 97 (Luxembourg)	2–6	(Sweden) BK Häcken	1–1	1–5
Aalesund (Norway)	6–1	(Wales) Neath	4–1	2–0
Renova (North Macedonia)	3–3 (2–3 p)	(Northern Ireland) Glentoran	2–1	1–2 (a.e.t.)
Koper (Slovenia)	2–3	(Kazakhstan) Shakhter Karagandy	1–1	1–2
Banga (Lithuania)	0–7	(Azerbaijan) Qarabağ	0–4	0–3
UE Santa Coloma (Andorra)	0–5	(Hungary) Paks	0–1	0–4
Narva Trans (Estonia)	1–7	(North Macedonia) Rabotnicki	1–4	0–3
Rad (Serbia)	9–1	(San Marino) Tre Penne	6–0	3–1
Budućnost Podgorica (Montenegro)	3–4	(Albania) Flamurtari	1–3	2–1
Ferencváros (Hungary)	5–0	(Armenia) Ulisses	3–0	2–0
Jagiellonia Białystok (Poland)	1–2	(Kazakhstan) Irtysh	1–0	0–2
AZAL Baku (Azerbaijan)	2–3	(Belarus) Minsk	1–1	1–2
Dinamo Tbilisi (Georgia (country))	5–1	(Moldova) Milsami Orhei	2–0	3–1
Varaždin (Croatia)	6–1	(Andorra) Lusitanos	5–1	1–0
Banants (Armenia)	1–2	(Georgia (country)) Metalurgi Rustavi	0–1	1–1
Birkirkara (Malta)	1–2	(Albania) Vllaznia	0–1	1–1
Široki Brijeg (Bosnia and Herzegovina)	0–3	(Slovenia) Olimpija Ljubljana	0–0	0–3
Spartak Trnava (Slovakia)	4–2	(Montenegro) Zeta	3–0	1–2

=== Second qualifying round ===
The draw for the second qualifying round was held on 20 June 2011, immediately after the first qualifying round draw. The first legs were played on 14 July, and the second legs were played on 21 July 2011.

Team 1	Agg.	Team 2	1st leg	2nd leg
Metalurgi Rustavi (Georgia (country))	3–1	(Kazakhstan) Irtysh	1–1	2–0
Sūduva (Lithuania)	1–4	(Sweden) IF Elfsborg	1–1	0–3
Metalurg Skopje (North Macedonia)	2–3	(Bulgaria) Lokomotiv Sofia	0–0	2–3
Sant Julià (Andorra)	0–4	(Israel) Bnei Yehuda	0–2	0–2
Željezničar (Bosnia and Herzegovina)	1–0	(Moldova) Sheriff Tiraspol	1–0	0–0
KuPS (Finland)	1–2	(Romania) Gaz Metan Mediaș	1–0	0–2
Minsk (Belarus)	2–5	(Turkey) Gaziantepspor	1–1	1–4
Iskra-Stal (Moldova)	2–4	(Croatia) Varaždin	1–1	1–3
Tauras Tauragė (Lithuania)	2–5	(Netherlands) ADO Den Haag	2–3	0–2
Glentoran (Northern Ireland)	0–5	(Ukraine) Vorskla Poltava	0–2	0–3
Juvenes/Dogana (San Marino)	0–4	(North Macedonia) Rabotnicki	0–1	0–3
Örebro SK (Sweden)	0–2	(Bosnia and Herzegovina) Sarajevo	0–0	0–2
Crusaders (Northern Ireland)	1–7	(England) Fulham	1–3	0–4
Llanelli (Wales)	2–6	(Georgia (country)) Dinamo Tbilisi	2–1	0–5
Floriana (Malta)	0–9	(Cyprus) AEK Larnaca	0–8	0–1
Shakhtyor Soligorsk (Belarus)	2–4	(Latvia) Ventspils	0–1	2–3
Flamurtari (Albania)	1–7	(Czech Republic) Jablonec	0–2	1–5
KR (Iceland)	3–2	(Slovakia) Žilina	3–0	0–2
Vålerenga (Norway)	2–0 (Note: Order of legs reversed after original draw.)	(Armenia) Mika	1–0	1–0
Olimpija Ljubljana (Slovenia)	3–1	(Republic of Ireland) Bohemians	2–0	1–1
Domžale (Slovenia)	2–5	(Croatia) RNK Split	1–2	1–3
Differdange 03 (Luxembourg)	1–0	(Estonia) Levadia Tallinn	0–0	1–0
Tirana (Albania)	1–3	(Slovakia) Spartak Trnava	0–0	1–3
Ferencváros (Hungary)	3–4	(Norway) Aalesund	2–1	1–3 (a.e.t.)
Liepājas Metalurgs (Latvia)	1–4	(Austria) Red Bull Salzburg	1–4	0–0
Rad (Serbia)	1–2	(Greece) Olympiacos Volos	0–1	1–1
The New Saints (Wales)	3–8	(Denmark) Midtjylland	1–3	2–5
Kecskemét (Hungary)	1–1 (a)	(Kazakhstan) Aktobe	1–1	0–0
BK Häcken (Sweden)	3–0	(Finland) Honka	1–0	2–0
Anorthosis Famagusta (Cyprus)	3–2	(Georgia (country)) Gagra	3–0	0–2
Vaduz (Liechtenstein)	3–3 (a)	(Serbia) Vojvodina	0–2	3–1
Rudar Pljevlja (Montenegro)	0–5	Austria Wien	0–3	0–2
Śląsk Wrocław (Poland)	3–3 (a)	(Scotland) Dundee United	1–0	2–3
Shakhter Karagandy (Kazakhstan)	2–3	(Republic of Ireland) St Patrick's Athletic	2–1	0–2
EB/Streymur (Faroe Islands)	1–1 (a)	(Azerbaijan) Qarabağ	1–1	0–0
FH (Iceland)	1–3	(Portugal) Nacional	1–1	0–2
Paks (Hungary)	4–1	(Norway) Tromsø	1–1	3–0
TPS (Finland)	0–1	(Belgium) Westerlo	0–1	0–0
Maccabi Tel Aviv (Israel)	3–1	(Azerbaijan) Khazar Lankaran	3–1	0–0
Vllaznia (Albania)	1–2	(Switzerland) Thun	0–0	1–2

=== Third qualifying round ===
The draw for the third qualifying round was held on 15 July 2011. The first legs were played on 26 and 28 July, and the second legs were played on 4 August 2011.

Team 1	Agg.	Team 2	1st leg	2nd leg
Atlético Madrid (Spain)	4–1	(Norway) Strømsgodset	2–1	2–0
Young Boys (Switzerland)	5–1	(Belgium) Westerlo	3–1	2–0
Ventspils (Latvia)	1–9	(Serbia) Red Star Belgrade	1–2	0–7
Alania Vladikavkaz (Russia)	2–2 (4–2 p)	(Kazakhstan) Aktobe	1–1	1–1 (a.e.t.)
AEK Larnaca (Cyprus)	5–2	(Czech Republic) Mladá Boleslav	3–0	2–2
Željezničar (Bosnia and Herzegovina)	0–8	(Israel) Maccabi Tel Aviv	0–2	0–6
AZ (Netherlands)	3–1	(Czech Republic) Jablonec	2–0	1–1
Olimpija Ljubljana (Slovenia)	3–4	Austria Wien	1–1	2–3
Bursaspor (Turkey)	5–2	(Belarus) Gomel	2–1	3–1
Aalesund (Norway)	5–1	(Sweden) IF Elfsborg	4–0	1–1
Gaziantepspor (Turkey)	0–1	(Poland) Legia Warsaw	0–1	0–0
Hapoel Tel Aviv (Israel)	5–2	(Liechtenstein) Vaduz	4–0	1–2
Metalurgi Rustavi (Georgia (country))	2–7	(France) Rennes	2–5	0–2
Levski Sofia (Bulgaria)	3–3 (4–5 p)	(Slovakia) Spartak Trnava	2–1	1–2 (a.e.t.)
Midtjylland (Denmark)	1–2	(Portugal) Vitória de Guimarães	0–0	1–2
Dinamo București (Romania)	4–3	(Croatia) Varaždin	2–2	2–1
Karpaty Lviv (Ukraine)	5–1	(Republic of Ireland) St Patrick's Athletic	2–0	3–1
Palermo (Italy)	3–3 (a) (Note: Order of legs reversed after original draw.)	(Switzerland) Thun	2–2	1–1
KR (Iceland)	1–6	(Georgia (country)) Dinamo Tbilisi	1–4	0–2
Omonia (Cyprus)	3–1	(Netherlands) ADO Den Haag	3–0	0–1
Red Bull Salzburg (Austria)	4–0	(Slovakia) Senica	1–0	3–0
Club Brugge (Belgium)	4–2	(Azerbaijan) Qarabağ	4–1	0–1
Differdange 03 (Luxembourg)	w/o (Note: Greek club Olympiacos Volos, who had reached the play-off round, were excluded from the competition by UEFA on 11 August 2011 for their involvement in the Koriopolis match-fixing scandal. UEFA decided to replace them in the play-off round with Differdange 03 from Luxembourg, who had lost to Olympiacos Volos in the previous round.)	(Greece) Olympiacos Volos	0–3	0–3
Mainz 05 (Germany)	2–2 (3–4 p)	(Romania) Gaz Metan Mediaș	1–1	1–1 (a.e.t.)
Bnei Yehuda (Israel)	1–3	(Sweden) Helsingborgs IF	1–0	0–3
Stoke City (England)	2–0	(Croatia) Hajduk Split	1–0	1–0
Anorthosis Famagusta (Cyprus)	2–3	(North Macedonia) Rabotnicki	0–2	2–1
Sparta Prague (Czech Republic)	7–0	(Bosnia and Herzegovina) Sarajevo	5–0	2–0
Vorskla Poltava (Ukraine)	2–0	(Republic of Ireland) Sligo Rovers	0–0	2–0
Paks (Hungary)	2–5	(Scotland) Heart of Midlothian	1–1	1–4
Śląsk Wrocław (Poland)	0–0 (4–3 p)	(Bulgaria) Lokomotiv Sofia	0–0	0–0 (a.e.t.)
Nacional (Portugal)	4–2	(Sweden) BK Häcken	3–0	1–2
Ried (Austria)	4–4 (a)	(Denmark) Brøndby	2–0	2–4
Vålerenga (Norway)	0–5	(Greece) PAOK	0–2	0–3
RNK Split (Croatia)	0–2	(England) Fulham	0–0	0–2

== Play-off round ==
The draw for the play-off round was held on 5 August 2011. The first legs were played on 18 August, and the second legs were played on 25 August 2011.

Team 1	Agg.	Team 2	1st leg	2nd leg
Maccabi Tel Aviv (Israel)	4–2	(Greece) Panathinaikos	3–0	1–2
Atlético Madrid (Spain)	6–0	(Portugal) Vitória de Guimarães	2–0	4–0
Shamrock Rovers (Republic of Ireland)	3–2	(Serbia) Partizan	1–1	2–1 (a.e.t.)
Metalist Kharkiv (Ukraine)	4–0	(France) Sochaux	0–0	4–0
Beşiktaş (Turkey)	3–2	(Russia) Alania Vladikavkaz	3–0	0–2
Rosenborg (Norway)	1–2	(Cyprus) AEK Larnaca	0–0	1–2
Vorskla Poltava (Ukraine)	5–3	(Romania) Dinamo București	2–1	3–2
Bursaspor (Turkey)	3–4	(Belgium) Anderlecht	1–2	2–2
Slovan Bratislava (Slovakia)	2–1 (Note: Order of legs reversed after original draw.)	(Italy) Roma	1–0	1–1
Differdange 03 (Luxembourg)	0–6	(France) Paris Saint-Germain	0–4	0–2
Legia Warsaw (Poland)	5–4	(Russia) Spartak Moscow	2–2	3–2
Ekranas (Lithuania)	1–4	(Israel) Hapoel Tel Aviv	1–0	0–4
PAOK (Greece)	3–1	(Ukraine) Karpaty Lviv	2–0	1–1
Athletic Bilbao (Spain)	w/o (Note: Order of legs reversed after original draw. Also, as a result of match-fixing allegations, Turkish club Fenerbahçe were removed from the 2011–12 UEFA Champions League and were replaced with Trabzonspor on 24 August 2011. As a result, Trabzonspor's second leg against Athletic Bilbao was cancelled, and Athletic Bilbao qualified for the group stage.)	(Turkey) Trabzonspor	0–0	Canc.
Heart of Midlothian (Scotland)	0–5	(England) Tottenham Hotspur	0–5	0–0
Maribor (Slovenia)	3–2	(Scotland) Rangers	2–1	1–1
Steaua București (Romania)	3–1	(Bulgaria) CSKA Sofia	2–0	1–1
Nordsjælland (Denmark)	1–2	(Portugal) Sporting CP	0–0	1–2
Fulham (England)	3–1	(Ukraine) Dnipro Dnipropetrovsk	3–0	0–1
Lokomotiv Moscow (Russia)	3–1	(Slovakia) Spartak Trnava	2–0	1–1
Celtic (Scotland)	6–0 (Note: Order of legs reversed after original draw. Also, Celtic lodged protests over the eligibility of a number of the Sion players who participated in the two legs of the play-off round, which Sion won 3–1 aggregate (first leg: 0–0; second leg: 3–1). The UEFA Control and Disciplinary Body accepted the protests and decided to award both matches to Celtic by forfeit (3–0). As a consequence, Celtic qualified for the UEFA Europa League group stage.)	(Switzerland) Sion	3–0	3–0
Śląsk Wrocław (Poland)	2–4	(Romania) Rapid București	1–3	1–1
Litex Lovech (Bulgaria)	1–3	(Ukraine) Dynamo Kyiv	1–2	0–1
Lazio (Italy)	9–1	(North Macedonia) Rabotnicki	6–0	3–1
Nacional (Portugal)	0–3	(England) Birmingham City	0–0	0–3
Ried (Austria)	0–5	(Netherlands) PSV Eindhoven	0–0	0–5
Thun (Switzerland)	1–5	(England) Stoke City	0–1	1–4
Aalesund (Norway)	2–7	(Netherlands) AZ	2–1	0–6
Vaslui (Romania)	2–1	(Czech Republic) Sparta Prague	2–0	0–1
Omonia (Cyprus)	2–2 (a)	(Austria) Red Bull Salzburg	2–1	0–1
Zestaponi (Georgia (country))	3–5	(Belgium) Club Brugge	3–3	0–2
Hannover 96 (Germany)	3–2	(Spain) Sevilla	2–1	1–1
HJK (Finland)	3–6	(Germany) Schalke 04	2–0	1–6
AEK Athens (Greece)	2–1	(Georgia (country)) Dinamo Tbilisi	1–0	1–1 (a.e.t.)
Red Star Belgrade (Serbia)	1–6	(France) Rennes	1–2	0–4
Austria Wien	3–2	(Romania) Gaz Metan Mediaș	3–1	0–1
Braga (Portugal)	2–2 (a)	(Switzerland) Young Boys	0–0	2–2
Standard Liège (Belgium)	4–1	(Sweden) Helsingborgs IF	1–0	3–1

== Group stage ==
Location of teams of the 2011–12 UEFA Europa League group stage.
Red: Group A; Yellow: Group B; Green: Group C; Dark green: Group D;
Purple: Group E; Pink: Group F; Blue: Group G; Orange: Group H;
Brown: Group I; Deep pink: Group J; Cyan: Group K; Spring green: Group L.

The group stage features 48 teams, which were allocated into pots based on their 2011 UEFA club coefficients, and then drawn into twelve groups of four. Teams from the same association cannot be drawn against each other. The draw was held on 26 August 2011 in Monaco.

In each group, teams play against each other home-and-away in a round-robin format. The matchdays are 15 September, 29 September, 20 October, 3 November, 30 November – 1 December, and 14–15 December 2011. The group winners and runners-up advanced to the round of 32, where they were joined by the 8 third-placed teams from the group stage of the 2011–12 UEFA Champions League.

If two or more teams are equal on points on completion of the group matches, the following criteria are applied to determine the rankings (in descending order):

1. higher number of points obtained in the group matches played among the teams in question;
2. superior goal difference from the group matches played among the teams in question;
3. higher number of goals scored in the group matches played among the teams in question;
4. higher number of goals scored away from home in the group matches played among the teams in question;
5. If, after applying criteria 1) to 4) to several teams, two teams still have an equal ranking, the criteria 1) to 4) will be reapplied to determine the ranking of these teams;
6. superior goal difference from all group matches played;
7. higher number of goals scored from all group matches played;
8. higher number of coefficient points accumulated by the club in question, as well as its association, over the previous five seasons.

A total of 24 national associations are represented in this group stage (including Scotland after Celtic were reinstated into the Europa League over Sion), with England having the most teams, with four. This was also the first time an Irish side were represented in the group stage.

=== Group A ===
Pos	Team	Pld	W	D	L	GF	GA	GD	Pts	Qualification	PAOK	RK	TH	SR
1	(Greece) PAOK	6	3	3	0	10	6	+4	12	Advance to knockout phase	—	1–1	0–0	2–1
2	(Russia) Rubin Kazan	6	3	2	1	11	5	+6	11	Advance to knockout phase	2–2	—	1–0	4–1
3	(England) Tottenham Hotspur	6	3	1	2	9	4	+5	10		1–2	1–0	—	3–1
4	(Republic of Ireland) Shamrock Rovers	6	0	0	6	4	19	−15	0		1–3	0–3	0–4	—

Source: Soccerway

=== Group B ===
Pos	Team	Pld	W	D	L	GF	GA	GD	Pts	Qualification	SL	HAN	COP	VP
1	(Belgium) Standard Liège	6	4	2	0	9	1	+8	14	Advance to knockout phase	—	2–0	3–0	0–0
2	(Germany) Hannover 96	6	3	2	1	9	7	+2	11	Advance to knockout phase	0–0	—	2–2	3–1
3	(Denmark) Copenhagen	6	1	2	3	5	9	−4	5		0–1	1–2	—	1–0
4	(Ukraine) Vorskla Poltava	6	0	2	4	4	10	−6	2		1–3	1–2	1–1	—

Source: Soccerway

=== Group C ===
Pos	Team	Pld	W	D	L	GF	GA	GD	Pts	Qualification	PSV	LW	HTA	RB
1	(Netherlands) PSV Eindhoven	6	5	1	0	13	5	+8	16	Advance to knockout phase	—	1–0	3–3	2–1
2	(Poland) Legia Warsaw	6	3	0	3	7	9	−2	9	Advance to knockout phase	0–3	—	3–2	3–1
3	(Israel) Hapoel Tel Aviv	6	2	1	3	10	9	+1	7		0–1	2–0	—	0–1
4	(Romania) Rapid București	6	1	0	5	5	12	−7	3		1–3	0–1	1–3	—

Source: Soccerway

=== Group D ===
Pos	Team	Pld	W	D	L	GF	GA	GD	Pts	Qualification	SCP	LAZ	VAS	ZÜR
1	(Portugal) Sporting CP	6	4	0	2	8	4	+4	12	Advance to knockout phase	—	2–1	2–0	2–0
2	(Italy) Lazio	6	2	3	1	7	5	+2	9	Advance to knockout phase	2–0	—	2–2	1–0
3	(Romania) Vaslui	6	1	3	2	5	8	−3	6		1–0	0–0	—	2–2
4	(Switzerland) Zürich	6	1	2	3	5	8	−3	5		0–2	1–1	2–0	—

Source: Soccerway

=== Group E ===
Pos	Team	Pld	W	D	L	GF	GA	GD	Pts	Qualification	BEŞ	SC	DK	MTA
1	(Turkey) Beşiktaş	6	4	0	2	13	7	+6	12	Advance to knockout phase	—	3–1	1–0	5–1
2	(England) Stoke City	6	3	2	1	10	7	+3	11	Advance to knockout phase	2–1	—	1–1	3–0
3	(Ukraine) Dynamo Kyiv	6	1	4	1	7	7	0	7		1–0	1–1	—	3–3
4	(Israel) Maccabi Tel Aviv	6	0	2	4	8	17	−9	2		2–3	1–2	1–1	—

Source: Soccerway

=== Group F ===
Pos	Team	Pld	W	D	L	GF	GA	GD	Pts	Qualification	AB	RBS	PSG	SB
1	(Spain) Athletic Bilbao	6	4	1	1	11	8	+3	13	Advance to knockout phase	—	2–2	2–0	2–1
2	(Austria) Red Bull Salzburg	6	3	1	2	11	8	+3	10 (Note: Tied on head-to-head points (3) and head-to-head goal difference (0). Head-to-head away goals: Red Bull Salzburg 1, Paris Saint-Germain 0.)	Advance to knockout phase	0–1	—	2–0	3–0
3	(France) Paris Saint-Germain	6	3	1	2	8	7	+1	10		4–2	3–1	—	1–0
4	(Slovakia) Slovan Bratislava	6	0	1	5	4	11	−7	1		1–2	2–3	0–0	—

Source: Soccerway

=== Group G ===
Pos	Team	Pld	W	D	L	GF	GA	GD	Pts	Qualification	MK	AZ	AW	MFF
1	(Ukraine) Metalist Kharkiv	6	4	2	0	15	6	+9	14	Advance to knockout phase	—	1–1	4–1	3–1
2	(Netherlands) AZ	6	1	5	0	10	7	+3	8 (Note: Tied on head-to-head results. Overall goal difference was used as the tiebreaker.)	Advance to knockout phase	1–1	—	2–2	4–1
3	Austria Wien	6	2	2	2	10	11	−1	8		1–2	2–2	—	2–0
4	(Sweden) Malmö FF	6	0	1	5	4	15	−11	1		1–4	0–0	1–2	—

Source: Soccerway

=== Group H ===
Pos	Team	Pld	W	D	L	GF	GA	GD	Pts	Qualification	CB	BRA	BC	MAR
1	(Belgium) Club Brugge	6	3	2	1	12	9	+3	11 (Note: Head-to-head points: Club Brugge 4, Braga 1.)	Advance to knockout phase	—	1–1	1–2	2–0
2	(Portugal) Braga	6	3	2	1	12	6	+6	11	Advance to knockout phase	1–2	—	1–0	5–1
3	(England) Birmingham City	6	3	1	2	8	8	0	10		2–2	1–3	—	1–0
4	(Slovenia) Maribor	6	0	1	5	6	15	−9	1		3–4	1–1	1–2	—

Source: Soccerway

=== Group I ===
Pos	Team	Pld	W	D	L	GF	GA	GD	Pts	Qualification	AM	UDI	CEL	REN
1	(Spain) Atlético Madrid	6	4	1	1	11	4	+7	13	Advance to knockout phase	—	4–0	2–0	3–1
2	(Italy) Udinese	6	2	3	1	6	7	−1	9	Advance to knockout phase	2–0	—	1–1	2–1
3	(Scotland) Celtic	6	1	3	2	6	7	−1	6		0–1	1–1	—	3–1
4	(France) Rennes	6	0	3	3	5	10	−5	3		1–1	0–0	1–1	—

Source: Soccerway

=== Group J ===
Pos	Team	Pld	W	D	L	GF	GA	GD	Pts	Qualification	SCH	SB	MHA	AEK
1	(Germany) Schalke 04	6	4	2	0	13	2	+11	14	Advance to knockout phase	—	2–1	3–1	0–0
2	(Romania) Steaua București	6	2	2	2	9	11	−2	8	Advance to knockout phase	0–0	—	4–2	3–1
3	(Israel) Maccabi Haifa	6	2	0	4	10	12	−2	6		0–3	5–0	—	1–0
4	(Cyprus) AEK Larnaca	6	1	2	3	4	11	−7	5		0–5	1–1	2–1	—

Source: Soccerway

=== Group K ===
Pos	Team	Pld	W	D	L	GF	GA	GD	Pts	Qualification	TWE	WK	FUL	OB
1	(Netherlands) Twente	6	4	1	1	14	7	+7	13	Advance to knockout phase	—	4–1	1–0	3–2
2	(Poland) Wisła Kraków	6	3	0	3	8	13	−5	9	Advance to knockout phase	2–1	—	1–0	1–3
3	(England) Fulham	6	2	2	2	9	6	+3	8		1–1	4–1	—	2–2
4	(Denmark) Odense	6	1	1	4	9	14	−5	4		1–4	1–2	0–2	—

Source: Soccerway

=== Group L ===
Pos	Team	Pld	W	D	L	GF	GA	GD	Pts	Qualification	AND	LM	AEK	SG
1	(Belgium) Anderlecht	6	6	0	0	18	5	+13	18	Advance to knockout phase	—	5–3	4–1	3–0
2	(Russia) Lokomotiv Moscow	6	4	0	2	14	11	+3	12	Advance to knockout phase	0–2	—	3–1	3–1
3	(Greece) AEK Athens	6	1	0	5	8	15	−7	3 (Note: Tied on head-to-head points (3). Head-to-head goal difference: AEK Athens +1, Sturm Graz −1.)		1–2	1–3	—	1–2
4	(Austria) Sturm Graz	6	1	0	5	5	14	−9	3		0–2	1–2	1–3	—

Source: Soccerway

== Knockout phase ==
In the knockout phase, teams play against each other over two legs on a home-and-away basis, except for the one-match final.

In the draw for the round of 32, the twelve group winners and the four better third-placed teams from the Champions League group stage (based on their match record in the group stage) are seeded, and the twelve group runners-up and the other four third-placed teams from the Champions League group stage are unseeded. A seeded team is drawn against an unseeded team, with the seeded team hosting the second leg. Teams from the same group or the same association cannot be drawn against each other. In the draws for the round of 16 onwards, there are no seedings, and teams from the same group or the same association may be drawn with each other.

=== Bracket ===
Round of 32
(Italy) Lazio	1	0	1
(Spain) Atlético Madrid	3	1	4
(Portugal) Braga	0	1	1
(Turkey) Beşiktaş	2	0	2
(Poland) Wisła Kraków	1	0	1
(Belgium) Standard Liège (a)	1	0	1
(Germany) Hannover 96	2	1	3
(Belgium) Club Brugge	1	0	1
(Netherlands) AZ	1	1	2
(Belgium) Anderlecht	0	0	0
(Italy) Udinese	0	3	3
(Greece) PAOK	0	0	0
(England) Stoke City	0	0	0
(Spain) Valencia	1	1	2
(Turkey) Trabzonspor	1	1	2
(Netherlands) PSV Eindhoven	2	4	6
(Poland) Legia Warsaw	2	0	2
(Portugal) Sporting CP	2	1	3
(Portugal) Porto	1	0	1
(England) Manchester City	2	4	6
(Austria) Red Bull Salzburg	0	1	1
(Ukraine) Metalist Kharkiv	4	4	8
(Russia) Rubin Kazan	0	0	0
(Greece) Olympiacos	1	1	2
(Romania) Steaua București	0	0	0
(Netherlands) Twente	1	1	2
(Czech Republic) Viktoria Plzeň	1	1	2
(Germany) Schalke 04 (a.e.t.)	1	3	4
(Netherlands) Ajax	0	2	2
(England) Manchester United	2	1	3
(Russia) Lokomotiv Moscow	2	0	2
(Spain) Athletic Bilbao (a)	1	1	2

Round of 16
(Spain) Atlético Madrid	3	3	6
(Turkey) Beşiktaş	1	0	1
(Belgium) Standard Liège	2	0	2
(Germany) Hannover 96	2	4	6
(Netherlands) AZ	2	1	3
(Italy) Udinese	0	2	2
(Spain) Valencia	4	1	5
(Netherlands) PSV Eindhoven	2	1	3
(Portugal) Sporting CP (a)	1	2	3
(England) Manchester City	0	3	3
(Ukraine) Metalist Kharkiv (a)	0	2	2
(Greece) Olympiacos	1	1	2
(Netherlands) Twente	1	1	2
(Germany) Schalke 04	0	4	4
(England) Manchester United	2	1	3
(Spain) Athletic Bilbao	3	2	5

Quarter-finals
(Spain) Atlético Madrid	2	2	4
(Germany) Hannover 96	1	1	2
(Netherlands) AZ	2	0	2
(Spain) Valencia	1	4	5
(Portugal) Sporting CP	2	1	3
(Ukraine) Metalist Kharkiv	1	1	2
(Germany) Schalke 04	2	2	4
(Spain) Athletic Bilbao	4	2	6

Semi-finals
(Spain) Atlético Madrid	4	1	5
(Spain) Valencia	2	0	2
(Portugal) Sporting CP	2	1	3
(Spain) Athletic Bilbao	1	3	4

Final
9 May – Bucharest
(Spain) Atlético Madrid	3
(Spain) Athletic Bilbao	0

=== Round of 32 ===
The draw for the round of 32 was held on 16 December 2011. The first legs were played on 14 and 16 February, and the second legs were played on 22 and 23 February 2012.

Team 1	Agg.	Team 2	1st leg	2nd leg
Porto (Portugal)	1–6	(England) Manchester City	1–2	0–4
Ajax (Netherlands)	2–3	(England) Manchester United	0–2	2–1
Lokomotiv Moscow (Russia)	2–2 (a)	(Spain) Athletic Bilbao	2–1	0–1
Red Bull Salzburg (Austria)	1–8	(Ukraine) Metalist Kharkiv	0–4	1–4
Stoke City (England)	0–2	(Spain) Valencia	0–1	0–1
Rubin Kazan (Russia)	0–2	(Greece) Olympiacos	0–1	0–1
AZ (Netherlands)	2–0	(Belgium) Anderlecht	1–0	1–0
Lazio (Italy)	1–4	(Spain) Atlético Madrid	1–3	0–1
Steaua București (Romania)	0–2	(Netherlands) Twente	0–1	0–1
Viktoria Plzeň (Czech Republic)	2–4	(Germany) Schalke 04	1–1	1–3 (a.e.t.)
Wisła Kraków (Poland)	1–1 (a)	(Belgium) Standard Liège	1–1	0–0
Braga (Portugal)	1–2	(Turkey) Beşiktaş	0–2	1–0
Udinese (Italy)	3–0	(Greece) PAOK	0–0	3–0
Trabzonspor (Turkey)	2–6	(Netherlands) PSV Eindhoven	1–2	1–4
Hannover 96 (Germany)	3–1	(Belgium) Club Brugge	2–1	1–0
Legia Warsaw (Poland)	2–3	(Portugal) Sporting CP	2–2	0–1

=== Round of 16 ===
The draw for the round of 16 was held on 16 December 2011, immediately after the round of 32 draw. The first legs were played on 8 March, and the second legs were played on 15 March 2012.

Team 1	Agg.	Team 2	1st leg	2nd leg
Metalist Kharkiv (Ukraine)	2–2 (a)	(Greece) Olympiacos	0–1	2–1
Sporting CP (Portugal)	3–3 (a)	(England) Manchester City	1–0	2–3
Twente (Netherlands)	2–4	(Germany) Schalke 04	1–0	1–4
Standard Liège (Belgium)	2–6	(Germany) Hannover 96	2–2	0–4
Valencia (Spain)	5–3	(Netherlands) PSV Eindhoven	4–2	1–1
AZ (Netherlands)	3–2	(Italy) Udinese	2–0	1–2
Atlético Madrid (Spain)	6–1	(Turkey) Beşiktaş	3–1	3–0
Manchester United (England)	3–5	(Spain) Athletic Bilbao	2–3	1–2

=== Quarter-finals ===
The draws for the quarter-finals were held on 16 March 2012. The first legs were played on 29 March, and the second legs on 5 April 2012.

Team 1	Agg.	Team 2	1st leg	2nd leg
AZ (Netherlands)	2–5	(Spain) Valencia	2–1	0–4
Schalke 04 (Germany)	4–6	(Spain) Athletic Bilbao	2–4	2–2
Sporting CP (Portugal)	3–2	(Ukraine) Metalist Kharkiv	2–1	1–1
Atlético Madrid (Spain)	4–2	(Germany) Hannover 96	2–1	2–1

=== Semi-finals ===
The draws for the semi-finals were held on 16 March 2012, immediately after the quarter-final draw. The first legs were played on 19 April, and the second legs were played on 26 April 2012.

Team 1	Agg.	Team 2	1st leg	2nd leg
Atlético Madrid (Spain)	5–2	(Spain) Valencia	4–2	1–0
Sporting CP (Portugal)	3–4	(Spain) Athletic Bilbao	2–1	1–3

=== Final ===
The final was played on 9 May 2012 at the Arena Națională in Bucharest, Romania. A draw was held on 16 March 2012, after the quarter-final and semi-final draws, to determine the "home" team for administrative purposes.

9 May 2012
21:45 UTC+3

Atlético Madrid (Spain)	3–0	(Spain) Athletic Bilbao
Falcao 7', 34'; Diego 85'	Report

Arena Națională, Bucharest
Attendance: 52,347
Referee: Wolfgang Stark (Germany)

== Statistics ==
Excluding qualifying rounds and play-off round.

=== Top goalscorers ===
Rank	Player	Team	Goals	Minutes played
1	(Colombia) Radamel Falcao	(Spain) Atlético Madrid	12	1215'
2	(Netherlands) Klaas-Jan Huntelaar	(Germany) Schalke 04	10	923'
3	(Spain) Adrián	(Spain) Atlético Madrid	8	1034'
4	(Argentina) Matías Suárez	(Belgium) Anderlecht	7	612'
4	(Spain) Fernando Llorente	(Spain) Athletic Bilbao	7	1121'
6	(Russia) Dmitri Sychev	(Russia) Lokomotiv Moscow	6	408'
6	(Netherlands) Ricky van Wolfswinkel	(Portugal) Sporting CP	6	1045'
8	(England) Andrew Johnson	(England) Fulham	5	411'
8	(Ukraine) Marko Dević	(Ukraine) Metalist Kharkiv	5	484'
8	(Argentina) Jonathan Cristaldo	(Ukraine) Metalist Kharkiv	5	579'
8	(Belgium) Guillaume Gillet	(Belgium) Anderlecht	5	698'
8	(Sweden) Ola Toivonen	(Netherlands) PSV Eindhoven	5	760'
8	(Slovenia) Tim Matavž	(Netherlands) PSV Eindhoven	5	787'
8	(Spain) Markel Susaeta	(Spain) Athletic Bilbao	5	1216'
8	(Spain) Iker Muniain	(Spain) Athletic Bilbao	5	1227'

Source: UEFA

=== Top assists ===
Rank	Player	Team	Assists	Minutes played
1	(Brazil) Diego	(Spain) Atlético Madrid	7	949'
2	(Portugal) Manuel Fernandes	(Turkey) Beşiktaş	5	720'
2	(Argentina) José Sosa	(Ukraine) Metalist Kharkiv	5	886'
4	(Greece) Georgios Georgiadis	(Greece) PAOK	4	484'
4	(Netherlands) Ola John	(Netherlands) Twente	4	658'
4	(Belgium) Dries Mertens	(Netherlands) PSV Eindhoven	4	754'
4	(Spain) Diego Capel	(Portugal) Sporting CP	4	862'
4	(Turkey) Arda Turan	(Spain) Atlético Madrid	4	875'
4	(Brazil) Cleiton Xavier	(Ukraine) Metalist Kharkiv	4	884'
10	(Ivory Coast) Yaya Touré	(England) Manchester City	3	270'
10	(England) Andros Townsend	(England) Tottenham Hotspur	3	314'
10	(Ukraine) Marko Dević	(Ukraine) Metalist Kharkiv	3	484'
10	(Ivory Coast) Didier Ya Konan	(Germany) Hannover 96	3	498'
10	(Argentina) Pablo Brandán	(Romania) Steaua București	3	607'
10	(Morocco) Zakaria Labyad	(Netherlands) PSV Eindhoven	3	637'
10	(Germany) Lars Stindl	(Germany) Hannover 96	3	907'
10	(Brazil) Taison	(Ukraine) Metalist Kharkiv	3	920'
10	(Spain) Fernando Llorente	(Spain) Athletic Bilbao	3	1121'
10	(Netherlands) Stijn Schaars	(Portugal) Sporting CP	3	1173'
10	(Spain) Markel Susaeta	(Spain) Athletic Bilbao	3	1216'

Source: UEFA

== See also ==
- 2011–12 UEFA Champions League
- 2012 UEFA Super Cup
