= Aleksandr Kvakhadze =

Georgian footballer

Lekso Kvakhadze
Personal information
- Full name: Aleksandre Kvakhadze
- Date of birth: 17 August 1984 (age 42)
- Place of birth: Mtskheta, Georgia
- Height: 1.88 m (6 ft 2 in)
- Position: Central defender

Senior career*
Years	Team	Apps	(Gls)
2004–2010	FC WIT Georgia	128	(7)
2010–2012	FC Metalurgi Rustavi	44	(2)
2012–2013	Torpedo Kutaisi	28	(3)
2013–2018	Dila Gori	112	(2)
2018–2019	Shevardeni-1906	11	(0)

International career^{‡}
2007–2009	Georgia	13	(0)
- * Club domestic league appearances and goals as of 11 November 2018 ‡ National team caps and goals as of 5 July 2016

Aleksandre Kvakhadze (Georgian: ალექსანდრე კვახაძე; born 17 August 1984), nicknamed Lesko, is a Georgian retired footballer who last played for Shevardeni-1906.
