= 2011–12 UEFA Europa League qualifying (first and second round matches) =

European football competition

This page summarises the matches of the first and second qualifying rounds of 2011–12 UEFA Europa League qualifying.

Times are CEST (UTC+2), as listed by UEFA (local times, if different, are in parentheses).

== First qualifying round ==
=== Summary ===
The first legs were played on 30 June, and the second legs were played on 7 July 2011.

Team 1	Agg.	Team 2	1st leg	2nd leg
ÍF (Faroe Islands)	2–8 (Note: Order of legs reversed after original draw.)	(Iceland) KR	1–3	1–5
Daugava Daugavpils (Latvia)	1–7	(Norway) Tromsø	0–5	1–2
IF Elfsborg (Sweden)	5–1	(Luxembourg) Fola Esch	4–0	1–1
The New Saints (Wales)	2–1	(Northern Ireland) Cliftonville	1–1	1–0
Honka (Finland)	2–0	(Estonia) Nõmme Kalju	0–0	2–0
Fulham (England)	3–0	(Faroe Islands) NSÍ	3–0	0–0
ÍBV (Iceland)	1–2	(Republic of Ireland) St Patrick's Athletic	1–0	0–2
Käerjéng 97 (Luxembourg)	2–6	(Sweden) BK Häcken	1–1	1–5
Aalesund (Norway)	6–1	(Wales) Neath	4–1	2–0
Renova (North Macedonia)	3–3 (2–3 p)	(Northern Ireland) Glentoran	2–1	1–2 (a.e.t.)
Koper (Slovenia)	2–3	(Kazakhstan) Shakhter Karagandy	1–1	1–2
Banga (Lithuania)	0–7	(Azerbaijan) Qarabağ	0–4	0–3
UE Santa Coloma (Andorra)	0–5	(Hungary) Paks	0–1	0–4
Narva Trans (Estonia)	1–7	(North Macedonia) Rabotnicki	1–4	0–3
Rad (Serbia)	9–1	(San Marino) Tre Penne	6–0	3–1
Budućnost Podgorica (Montenegro)	3–4	(Albania) Flamurtari	1–3	2–1
Ferencváros (Hungary)	5–0	(Armenia) Ulisses	3–0	2–0
Jagiellonia Białystok (Poland)	1–2	(Kazakhstan) Irtysh	1–0	0–2
AZAL Baku (Azerbaijan)	2–3	(Belarus) Minsk	1–1	1–2
Dinamo Tbilisi (Georgia (country))	5–1	(Moldova) Milsami Orhei	2–0	3–1
Varaždin (Croatia)	6–1	(Andorra) Lusitanos	5–1	1–0
Banants (Armenia)	1–2	(Georgia (country)) Metalurgi Rustavi	0–1	1–1
Birkirkara (Malta)	1–2	(Albania) Vllaznia	0–1	1–1
Široki Brijeg (Bosnia and Herzegovina)	0–3	(Slovenia) Olimpija Ljubljana	0–0	0–3
Spartak Trnava (Slovakia)	4–2	(Montenegro) Zeta	3–0	1–2

=== Matches ===
30 June 2011
20:00

ÍF (Faroe Islands)	1–3	(Iceland) KR
Lakjuni 8'	Report	Finnbogason 22'; G. R. Gunnarsson 30'; B. Sigurðsson 79'

Gundadalur, Tórshavn (Note: ÍF played their home match at Gundadalur, Tórshavn as their own Fuglafjørður Stadium did not meet the UEFA criteria.)
Attendance: 589
Referee: Sven Bindels (Luxembourg)
7 July 2011
21:15

KR (Iceland)	5–1	(Faroe Islands) ÍF
Baldvinsson 18', 56'; B. Jónsson 23'; Finnbogason 47'; Hauksson 90'	Report	Šarić 88'

KR-völlur, Reykjavík
Attendance: 877
Referee: Dag Vidar Hafsås (Norway)

KR won 8–2 on aggregate.

30 June 2011
18:00

Daugava Daugavpils (Latvia)	0–5	(Norway) Tromsø
	Report	Johansen 26'; Andersen 31', 60'; Jenssen 47'; Jama 72'

Celtnieks Stadium, Daugavpils
Attendance: 1,500
Referee: István Kovács (Romania)
7 July 2011
19:00

Tromsø (Norway)	2–1	(Latvia) Daugava Daugavpils
Møller 12'; Tsintsadze 53' (o.g.)	Report	Gongadze 33'

Alfheim Stadion, Tromsø
Attendance: 2,077
Referee: Anar Salmanov (Azerbaijan)

Tromsø won 7–1 on aggregate.

30 June 2011
18:00

IF Elfsborg (Sweden)	4–0	(Luxembourg) Fola Esch
Hiljemark 5'; Elm 24', 90+3'; Larsson 36'	Report

Borås Arena, Borås
Attendance: 2,109
Referee: Valery Vyalichka (Belarus)
7 July 2011
18:00

Fola Esch (Luxembourg)	1–1	(Sweden) IF Elfsborg
Allomerović 74'	Report	Schnell 37' (o.g.)

Stade de la Frontière, Esch-sur-Alzette (Note: Fola Esch played their home match at Stade de la Frontière, Esch-sur-Alzette as their own Stade Émile Mayrisch did not meet the UEFA criteria.)
Attendance: 703
Referee: Ivan Kružliak (Slovakia)

IF Elfsborg won 5–1 on aggregate.

30 June 2011
20:00

The New Saints (Wales)	1–1	(Northern Ireland) Cliftonville
Darlington 27'	Report	Johnston 39'

Park Hall, Oswestry
Attendance: 927
Referee: Clayton Pisani (Malta)
7 July 2011
20:45

Cliftonville (Northern Ireland)	0–1	(Wales) The New Saints
	Report	Baker 4'

Solitude, Belfast
Attendance: 1,221
Referee: Magnus Thorisson (Iceland)

The New Saints won 2–1 on aggregate.

30 June 2011
18:00

Honka (Finland)	0–0	(Estonia) Nõmme Kalju
	Report

ISS Stadion, Vantaa (Note: Honka played their home match at ISS Stadion, Vantaa as their own Tapiolan Urheilupuisto did not meet the UEFA criteria.)
Attendance: 2,100
Referee: Miroslav Zelinka (Czech Republic)
7 July 2011
18:30

Nõmme Kalju (Estonia)	0–2	(Finland) Honka
	Report	Savage 48'; Dudu 77'

Lilleküla Stadium, Tallinn (Note: Nõmme Kalju played their home match at Lilleküla Stadium, Tallinn as their own Hiiu Stadium did not meet the UEFA criteria.)
Attendance: 2,250
Referee: Fariz Yusifov (Azerbaijan)

Honka won 2–0 on aggregate.

30 June 2011
20:30

Fulham (England)	3–0	(Faroe Islands) NSÍ
Duff 33'; Murphy 61' (pen.); A. Johnson 70'	Report

Craven Cottage, London
Attendance: 14,910
Referee: Bernhard Brugger (Austria)
7 July 2011
19:45

NSÍ (Faroe Islands)	0–0	(England) Fulham
	Report

Svangaskarð, Toftir (Note: NSÍ played their home match at Svangaskarð, Toftir as their own Runavík Stadium did not meet the UEFA criteria.)
Attendance: 1,245
Referee: Nikolaj Hänni (Switzerland)

Fulham won 3–0 on aggregate.

30 June 2011
20:00

ÍBV (Iceland)	1–0	(Republic of Ireland) St Patrick's Athletic
Andri Ólafsson 50' (pen.)	Report

Hlíðarendi, Reykjavík (Note: ÍBV played their home match at Hlíðarendi, Reykjavík as their own Hásteinsvöllur did not meet the UEFA criteria.)
Attendance: 555
Referee: Michael Svendsen (Denmark)
7 July 2011
20:45

St Patrick's Athletic (Republic of Ireland)	2–0	(Iceland) ÍBV
Daly 24'; Doyle 36'	Report

Richmond Park, Dublin
Attendance: 2,100
Referee: Nerijus Dunauskas (Lithuania)

The New Saints won 2–1 on aggregate.

30 June 2011
20:00

Käerjéng 97 (Luxembourg)	1–1	(Sweden) BK Häcken
Da Cruz 85'	Report	Östberg 90+3'

Stade Josy Barthel, Luxembourg City (Note: Käerjéng 97 played their home match at Stade Josy Barthel, Luxembourg City as their own Stade um Bëchel did not meet the UEFA criteria.)
Attendance: 727
Referee: Igor Satchi (Moldova)
7 July 2011
19:00

BK Häcken (Sweden)	5–1	(Luxembourg) Käerjéng 97
Makondele 7' (pen.), 82' (pen.); Waris 42'; Williams 65'; Ranégie 84'	Report	Da Cruz 48'

Gamla Ullevi, Gothenburg (Note: BK Häcken played their home match at Gamla Ullevi, Gothenburg as their own Rambergsvallen did not meet the UEFA criteria.)
Attendance: 934
Referee: Thoroddur Hjaltalin (Iceland)

BK Häcken won 6–2 on aggregate.

30 June 2011
19:00

Aalesund (Norway)	4–1	(Wales) Neath
Fuhre 35'; Sylling Olsen 37'; Ulvestad 48'; Sellin 77'	Report	Trundle 23'

Color Line Stadion, Ålesund
Attendance: 3,847
Referee: Domagoj Vučkov (Croatia)
7 July 2011
20:00

Neath (Wales)	0–2	(Norway) Aalesund
	Report	Barrantes 53'; Sylling Olsen 79'

The Gnoll, Neath
Attendance: 600
Referee: Christof Dierick (Belgium)

Aalesund won 6–1 on aggregate.

30 June 2011
20:30

Renova (North Macedonia)	2–1	(Northern Ireland) Glentoran
Jančevski 14' (pen.); Bajrami 87'	Report	Nixon 45+3'

Philip II Arena, Skopje (Note: Renova played their home match at Philip II Arena, Skopje as their own Gradski stadion Tetovo did not meet the UEFA criteria.)
Attendance: 1,500
Referee: Dawid Piasecki (Poland)
7 July 2011
20:45

Glentoran (Northern Ireland)	2–1 (a.e.t.)	(North Macedonia) Renova
Clarke 31'; Murray 74'	Report	Ismaili 59'
Penalties
Waterworth (penalty scored); Murray (penalty missed); Boyce (penalty scored); Howland (penalty missed); Hill (penalty scored)	3–2	(penalty scored) Simovski; (penalty missed) Ismaili; (penalty scored) Nuhi; (penalty missed) Statovci; (penalty missed) Gafuri

The Oval, Belfast
Attendance: 1,424
Referee: Petteri Kari (Finland)

3–3 on aggregate; Glentoran won 3–2 on penalties.

30 June 2011
20:45

Koper (Slovenia)	1–1	(Kazakhstan) Shakhter Karagandy
Bubanja 84'	Report	Kukeyev 90+3' (pen.)

Bonifika Stadium, Koper
Attendance: 2,500
Referee: Georgi Vadachkoria (Georgia)
7 July 2011
15:00

Shakhter Karagandy (Kazakhstan)	2–1	(Slovenia) Koper
Konysbayev 45', 84'	Report	Osterc 32'

Stadion Shakhter, Karagandy
Attendance: 10,000
Referee: Anastassios Kakos (Greece)

Shakhter Karagandy won 3–2 on aggregate.

30 June 2011
17:30

Banga (Lithuania)	0–4	(Azerbaijan) Qarabağ
	Report	R. A. Sadygov 16'; Nadirov 33', 70'; Soltanov 88'

Gargždai Stadium, Gargždai
Attendance: 1,400
Referee: Thorvaldur Arnason (Iceland)
7 July 2011
18:00

Qarabağ (Azerbaijan)	3–0	(Lithuania) Banga
Teli 29'; A. Sadygov 35'; Agoli 77'	Report

Tofiq Bahramov Stadium, Baku (Note: Qarabağ played their home match at Tofiq Bahramov Stadium, Baku as their own Guzanli Olympic Complex Stadium did not meet the UEFA criteria.)
Attendance: 10,000
Referee: Yuriy Mozharovskyy (Ukraine)

Qarabağ won 7–0 on aggregate.

30 June 2011
19:00

UE Santa Coloma (Andorra)	0–1	(Hungary) Paks
	Report	Vayer 15'

Estadi Comunal d'Andorra la Vella, Andorra la Vella
Attendance: 650
Referee: Suren Baliyan (Armenia)
7 July 2011
20:00

Paks (Hungary)	4–0	(Andorra) UE Santa Coloma
Magasföldi 11', 49'; Böde 77'; Heffler 81'	Report

Stadion Sóstói, Székesfehérvár (Note: Paks played their home match at Stadion Sóstói, Székesfehérvár as their own Stadion PSE did not meet the UEFA criteria.)
Attendance: 2,000
Referee: Jovan Kaludjerović (Montenegro)

Paks won 5–0 on aggregate.

30 June 2011
17:30

Narva Trans (Estonia)	1–4	(North Macedonia) Rabotnicki
Epikhin 34'	Report	Velkovski 16'; Manevski 51'; Petkovski 73'; Grozdanoski 88'

Lilleküla Stadium, Tallinn (Note: Narva Trans played their home match at Lilleküla Stadium, Tallinn as their own Narva Kreenholmi Stadium did not meet the UEFA criteria.)
Attendance: 200
Referee: Alan Mario Sant (Malta)
7 July 2011
20:00

Rabotnicki (North Macedonia)	3–0	(Estonia) Narva Trans
Petrović 45'; Manevski 81'; Petkovski 90'	Report

Philip II Arena, Skopje
Attendance: 700
Referee: Roman Hrubeš (Czech Republic)

Rabotnicki won 7–1 on aggregate.

30 June 2011
17:30

Rad (Serbia)	6–0	(San Marino) Tre Penne
Stanojević 6' (pen.), 13'; Kojić 9', 48'; Mrkela 24'; Pršo 66'	Report

Stadion FK Obilić, Belgrade (Note: Rad played their home match at Stadion FK Obilić, Belgrade as their own Stadion Kralj Petar I did not meet the UEFA criteria.)
Attendance: 1,500
Referee: Petur Reinert (Faroe Islands)
7 July 2011
20:30

Tre Penne (San Marino)	1–3	(Serbia) Rad
Cardini 23'	Report	Kojić 27', 38'; Stanojević 75'

Stadio Olimpico, Serravalle
Attendance: 521
Referee: Anatoliy Vishnichenko (Kazakhstan)

Rad won 9–1 on aggregate.

30 June 2011
21:00

Budućnost Podgorica (Montenegro)	1–3	(Albania) Flamurtari
Bošković 53'	Report	Shehaj 23'; Xhafa 63'; Sakaj 65' (pen.)

Podgorica City Stadium, Podgorica
Attendance: 2,980
Referee: Tolga Özkalfa (Turkey)
7 July 2011
16:30

Flamurtari (Albania)	1–2	(Montenegro) Budućnost Podgorica
Shehaj 20'	Report	Bošković 72', 77' (pen.)

Flamurtari Stadium, Vlorë
Attendance: 4,000
Referee: Christopher Lautier (Malta)

Flamurtari won 4–3 on aggregate.

30 June 2011
19:00

Ferencváros (Hungary)	3–0	(Armenia) Ulisses
Józsi 31'; Otten 33'; Felipe 69'	Report

Stadion Albert Flórián, Budapest
Attendance: 6,600
Referee: Slavko Vinčić (Slovenia)
7 July 2011
16:00

Ulisses (Armenia)	0–2	(Hungary) Ferencváros
	Report	Abdi 35' (pen.); Oláh 90+7'

Hrazdan Stadium, Yerevan
Attendance: 1,500
Referee: Oleksandr Derdo (Ukraine)

Ferencváros won 5–0 on aggregate.

30 June 2011
20:30

Jagiellonia Białystok (Poland)	1–0	(Kazakhstan) Irtysh
Frankowski 80'	Report

Stadion Miejski, Białystok
Attendance: 4,200
Referee: Vlado Glodjović (Serbia)
7 July 2011
15:00

Irtysh (Kazakhstan)	2–0	(Poland) Jagiellonia Białystok
Coulibaly 37'; Maltsev 43'	Report

Pavlodar Central Stadium, Pavlodar
Attendance: 9,560
Referee: Alain Bieri (Switzerland)

Irtysh won 2–1 on aggregate.

30 June 2011
17:00

AZAL Baku (Azerbaijan)	1–1	(Belarus) Minsk
Ibekoyi 14'	Report	Voronkov 11'

AZAL Stadium, Baku
Attendance: 2,900
Referee: Andris Treimanis (Latvia)
7 July 2011
19:00

Minsk (Belarus)	2–1	(Azerbaijan) AZAL Baku
Lashankow 5'; Sashcheka 11'	Report	Sachywka 66' (o.g.)

Dinamo Stadium, Minsk
Attendance: 3,000
Referee: Angel Angelov (Bulgaria)

Minsk won 3–2 on aggregate.

30 June 2011
19:00

Dinamo Tbilisi (Georgia (country))	2–0	(Moldova) Milsami Orhei
Kvekveskiri 4'; Lekvtadze 71'	Report

Boris Paichadze Stadium, Tbilisi
Attendance: 12,000
Referee: Nikola Dabanović (Montenegro)
7 July 2011
17:00

Milsami Orhei (Moldova)	1–3	(Georgia (country)) Dinamo Tbilisi
Golban 90+2'	Report	Koshkadze 73'; Robertinho 90' (pen.), 90+4'

Complexul Sportiv Raional, Orhei
Attendance: 3,000
Referee: Ognjen Valjić (Bosnia and Herzegovina)

Dinamo Tbilisi won 5–1 on aggregate.

30 June 2011
19:00

Varaždin (Croatia)	5–1	(Andorra) Lusitanos
Šafarić 4', 59'; Glavica 39'; Glavina 57'; Vugrinec 78'	Report	Bertran 48'

Stadion Varteks, Varaždin
Attendance: 1,200
Referee: Lasha Silagava (Georgia)
7 July 2011
19:00

Lusitanos (Andorra)	0–1	(Croatia) Varaždin
	Report	Brlečić 62'

Estadi Comunal d'Andorra la Vella, Andorra la Vella
Attendance: 450
Referee: Arnold Hunter (Northern Ireland)

Varaždin won 6–1 on aggregate.

30 June 2011
17:00

Banants (Armenia)	0–1	(Georgia (country)) Metalurgi Rustavi
	Report	Kobalia 48'

Hanrapetakan Stadium, Yerevan (Note: Banants played their home match at Hanrapetakan Stadium, Yerevan as their own Banants Stadium did not meet the UEFA criteria.)
Attendance: 4,215
Referee: Eli Hacmon (Israel)
7 July 2011
15:00

Metalurgi Rustavi (Georgia (country))	1–1	(Armenia) Banants
Mikaberidze 18'	Report	Du Bala 72' (pen.)

Poladi Stadium, Rustavi
Attendance: 3,500
Referee: Neil Doyle (Republic of Ireland)

Metalurgi Rustavi won 2–1 on aggregate.

30 June 2011
20:30

Birkirkara (Malta)	0–1	(Albania) Vllaznia
	Report	Sukaj 2'

Hibernians Ground, Paola
Attendance: 776
Referee: Ignasi Villamayor Rozados (Andorra)
7 July 2011
19:00

Vllaznia (Albania)	1–1	(Malta) Birkirkara
Vajushi 4'	Report	Silva 17'

Loro Boriçi Stadium, Shkodër
Attendance: 5,000
Referee: Mário Vlk (Slovakia)

Vllaznia won 2–1 on aggregate.

30 June 2011
20:45

Široki Brijeg (Bosnia and Herzegovina)	0–0	(Slovenia) Olimpija Ljubljana
	Report

Stadion Pecara, Široki Brijeg
Attendance: 3,500
Referee: Stelios Trifonos (Cyprus)
7 July 2011
20:00

Olimpija Ljubljana (Slovenia)	3–0	(Bosnia and Herzegovina) Široki Brijeg
Radujko 15', 18'; Vršič 49'	Report

Stožice Stadium, Ljubljana
Attendance: 4,500
Referee: Yevhen Aranovskiy (Ukraine)

Olimpija Ljubljana won 3–0 on aggregate.

30 June 2011
19:00

Spartak Trnava (Slovakia)	3–0	(Montenegro) Zeta
Koné 30'; Kaščák 48'; Tomaček 81'	Report

Štadión Antona Malatinského, Trnava
Attendance: 1,737
Referee: Padraig Sutton (Republic of Ireland)
7 July 2011
17:00

Zeta (Montenegro)	2–1	(Slovakia) Spartak Trnava
Dabić 79'; Novović 81'	Report	Ciprys 90+4'

Gradski stadion, Nikšić (Note: Zeta played their home match at Gradski stadion, Nikšić as their own Stadion Trešnjica did not meet the UEFA criteria.)
Attendance: 650
Referee: Vitaly Sevostyanik (Belarus)

Spartak Trnava won 4–2 on aggregate.

== Second qualifying round ==
=== Summary ===
The first legs were played on 14 July, and the second legs were played on 21 July 2011.

Team 1	Agg.	Team 2	1st leg	2nd leg
Metalurgi Rustavi (Georgia (country))	3–1	(Kazakhstan) Irtysh	1–1	2–0
Sūduva (Lithuania)	1–4	(Sweden) IF Elfsborg	1–1	0–3
Metalurg Skopje (North Macedonia)	2–3	(Bulgaria) Lokomotiv Sofia	0–0	2–3
Sant Julià (Andorra)	0–4	(Israel) Bnei Yehuda	0–2	0–2
Željezničar (Bosnia and Herzegovina)	1–0	(Moldova) Sheriff Tiraspol	1–0	0–0
KuPS (Finland)	1–2	(Romania) Gaz Metan Mediaș	1–0	0–2
Minsk (Belarus)	2–5	(Turkey) Gaziantepspor	1–1	1–4
Iskra-Stal (Moldova)	2–4	(Croatia) Varaždin	1–1	1–3
Tauras Tauragė (Lithuania)	2–5	(Netherlands) ADO Den Haag	2–3	0–2
Glentoran (Northern Ireland)	0–5	(Ukraine) Vorskla Poltava	0–2	0–3
Juvenes/Dogana (San Marino)	0–4	(North Macedonia) Rabotnicki	0–1	0–3
Örebro SK (Sweden)	0–2	(Bosnia and Herzegovina) Sarajevo	0–0	0–2
Crusaders (Northern Ireland)	1–7	(England) Fulham	1–3	0–4
Llanelli (Wales)	2–6	(Georgia (country)) Dinamo Tbilisi	2–1	0–5
Floriana (Malta)	0–9	(Cyprus) AEK Larnaca	0–8	0–1
Shakhtyor Soligorsk (Belarus)	2–4	(Latvia) Ventspils	0–1	2–3
Flamurtari (Albania)	1–7	(Czech Republic) Jablonec	0–2	1–5
KR (Iceland)	3–2	(Slovakia) Žilina	3–0	0–2
Vålerenga (Norway)	2–0 (Note: Order of legs reversed after original draw.)	(Armenia) Mika	1–0	1–0
Olimpija Ljubljana (Slovenia)	3–1	(Republic of Ireland) Bohemians	2–0	1–1
Domžale (Slovenia)	2–5	(Croatia) RNK Split	1–2	1–3
Differdange 03 (Luxembourg)	1–0	(Estonia) Levadia Tallinn	0–0	1–0
Tirana (Albania)	1–3	(Slovakia) Spartak Trnava	0–0	1–3
Ferencváros (Hungary)	3–4	(Norway) Aalesund	2–1	1–3 (a.e.t.)
Liepājas Metalurgs (Latvia)	1–4	(Austria) Red Bull Salzburg	1–4	0–0
Rad (Serbia)	1–2	(Greece) Olympiacos Volos	0–1	1–1
The New Saints (Wales)	3–8	(Denmark) Midtjylland	1–3	2–5
Kecskemét (Hungary)	1–1 (a)	(Kazakhstan) Aktobe	1–1	0–0
BK Häcken (Sweden)	3–0	(Finland) Honka	1–0	2–0
Anorthosis Famagusta (Cyprus)	3–2	(Georgia (country)) Gagra	3–0	0–2
Vaduz (Liechtenstein)	3–3 (a)	(Serbia) Vojvodina	0–2	3–1
Rudar Pljevlja (Montenegro)	0–5	Austria Wien	0–3	0–2
Śląsk Wrocław (Poland)	3–3 (a)	(Scotland) Dundee United	1–0	2–3
Shakhter Karagandy (Kazakhstan)	2–3	(Republic of Ireland) St Patrick's Athletic	2–1	0–2
EB/Streymur (Faroe Islands)	1–1 (a)	(Azerbaijan) Qarabağ	1–1	0–0
FH (Iceland)	1–3	(Portugal) Nacional	1–1	0–2
Paks (Hungary)	4–1	(Norway) Tromsø	1–1	3–0
TPS (Finland)	0–1	(Belgium) Westerlo	0–1	0–0
Maccabi Tel Aviv (Israel)	3–1	(Azerbaijan) Khazar Lankaran	3–1	0–0
Vllaznia (Albania)	1–2	(Switzerland) Thun	0–0	1–2

=== Matches ===
14 July 2011
16:00

Metalurgi Rustavi (Georgia (country))	1–1	(Kazakhstan) Irtysh
Kvakhadze 73'	Report	Daskalov 79'

Poladi Stadium, Rustavi
Attendance: 3,000
Referee: Rene Eisner (Austria)
21 July 2011
15:00

Irtysh (Kazakhstan)	0–2	(Georgia (country)) Metalurgi Rustavi
	Report	Kobalia 23'; Modebadze 57'

Pavlodar Central Stadium, Pavlodar
Attendance: 10,000
Referee: Georgi Yordanov (Bulgaria)

Metalurgi Rustavi won 3–1 on aggregate.

14 July 2011
20:00

Sūduva (Lithuania)	1–1	(Sweden) IF Elfsborg
Beniušis 88'	Report	Keene 78'

Sūduva Stadium, Marijampolė
Attendance: 2,114
Referee: Alexander Kostadinov (Bulgaria)
21 July 2011
18:00

IF Elfsborg (Sweden)	3–0	(Lithuania) Sūduva
Elm 26'; Augustsson 58'; Hult 67'	Report

Borås Arena, Borås
Attendance: 3,417
Referee: Harald Lechner (Austria)

IF Elfsborg won 4–1 on aggregate.

14 July 2011
20:45

Metalurg Skopje (North Macedonia)	0–0	(Bulgaria) Lokomotiv Sofia
	Report

Philip II Arena, Skopje (Note: Metalurg Skopje played their home match at Philip II Arena, Skopje as their own Stadion Železarnica did not meet the UEFA criteria.)
Attendance: 4,000
Referee: Luc Wilmes (Luxembourg)
21 July 2011
19:30

Lokomotiv Sofia (Bulgaria)	3–2	(North Macedonia) Metalurg Skopje
Yordanov 58' (pen.), 85'; Bozhinov 89'	Report	Krstev 4'; Ilijoski 62'

Vasil Levski National Stadium, Sofia (Note: Lokomotiv Sofia played their home match at Vasil Levski National Stadium, Sofia as their own Lokomotiv Stadium did not meet the UEFA criteria.)
Attendance: 3,000
Referee: Cyril Zimmermann (Switzerland)

Lokomotiv Sofia won 3–2 on aggregate.

14 July 2011
18:30

Sant Julià (Andorra)	0–2	(Israel) Bnei Yehuda
	Report	Balili 6'; Marinković 56'

Estadi Comunal d'Andorra la Vella, Andorra la Vella
Attendance: 448
Referee: Ghennadi Sidenco (Moldova)
21 July 2011
19:00

Bnei Yehuda (Israel)	2–0	(Andorra) Sant Julià
Marinković 16'; Galván 89'	Report

Bloomfield Stadium, Tel Aviv
Attendance: 1,998
Referee: Ioannis Anastasiou (Cyprus)

Bnei Yehuda won 4–0 on aggregate.

14 July 2011
20:30

Željezničar (Bosnia and Herzegovina)	1–0	(Moldova) Sheriff Tiraspol
Bešlija 60'	Report

Asim Ferhatović Hase Stadium, Sarajevo (Note: Željezničar played their home match at Asim Ferhatović Hase Stadium, Sarajevo as it has a greater capacity than their own Stadion Grbavica.)
Attendance: 10,000
Referee: Anastasios Sidiropoulos (Greece)
21 July 2011
18:00

Sheriff Tiraspol (Moldova)	0–0	(Bosnia and Herzegovina) Željezničar
	Report

Malaya Sportivnaya Arena (Small Arena), Tiraspol (Note: Sheriff Tiraspol played their home match at Malaya Sportivnaya Arena (Small Arena), Tiraspol as it is located in the same complex as Sheriff Stadium, the club's main stadium.)
Attendance: 5,120
Referee: Kenn Hansen (Denmark)

Željezničar won 1–0 on aggregate.

14 July 2011
17:30

KuPS (Finland)	1–0	(Romania) Gaz Metan Mediaș
Venäläinen 16'	Report

Kuopion keskuskenttä, Kuopio
Attendance: 3,190
Referee: Anders Hermansen (Denmark)
21 July 2011
17:00

Gaz Metan Mediaș (Romania)	2–0	(Finland) KuPS
Petre 36'; Hoban 53'	Report

Stadionul Gaz Metan, Mediaș
Attendance: 6,000
Referee: Oliver Drachta (Austria)

Gaz Metan Mediaș won 2–1 on aggregate.

14 July 2011
19:00

Minsk (Belarus)	1–1	(Turkey) Gaziantepspor
Razin 22'	Report	Sachywka 51' (o.g.)

Dinamo Stadium, Minsk
Attendance: 4,200
Referee: Thorsten Kinhöfer (Germany)
21 July 2011
20:00

Gaziantepspor (Turkey)	4–1	(Belarus) Minsk
Güngör 28'; Wágner 73'; Popov 83'; Olcan 90+1'	Report	Zyanko 61'

Gaziantep Kamil Ocak Stadium, Gaziantep
Attendance: 6,499
Referee: Marijo Strahonja (Croatia)

Gaziantepspor won 5–2 on aggregate.

14 July 2011
18:00

Iskra-Stal (Moldova)	1–1	(Croatia) Varaždin
Ponomar 17'	Report	Tkalčić 13'

Malaya Sportivnaya Arena (Small Arena), Tiraspol (Note: Iskra-Stal played their home match at Malaya Sportivnaya Arena (Small Arena), Tiraspol as their own Orăşenesc Stadium did not meet the UEFA criteria.)
Attendance: 1,200
Referee: Luc Wouters (Belgium)
21 July 2011
19:00

Varaždin (Croatia)	3–1	(Moldova) Iskra-Stal
Vugrinec 14', 70'; Glavica 18'	Report	Novicov 41'

Stadion Varteks, Varaždin
Attendance: 2,250
Referee: Steven McLean (Scotland)

Varaždin won 4–2 on aggregate.

14 July 2011
18:00

Tauras Tauragė (Lithuania)	2–3	(Netherlands) ADO Den Haag
Jerković 56' (pen.); Seedorf 73'	Report	Immers 71', 82' (pen.); Gnedojus 90+4' (o.g.)

S. Darius and S. Girėnas Stadium, Kaunas (Note: Tauras Tauragė played their home match at S. Darius and S. Girėnas Stadium, Kaunas as their own Vytauto Stadium did not meet the UEFA criteria.)
Attendance: 1,400
Referee: Damir Batinić (Croatia)
21 July 2011
20:00

ADO Den Haag (Netherlands)	2–0	(Lithuania) Tauras Tauragė
Toornstra 45+1'; Chery 80'	Report

Kyocera Stadion, The Hague
Attendance: 13,111
Referee: Vassilios Pamporidis (Greece)

ADO Den Haag won 5–2 on aggregate.

14 July 2011
20:45

Glentoran (Northern Ireland)	0–2	(Ukraine) Vorskla Poltava
	Report	Bezus 29'; Januzi 38'

The Oval, Belfast
Attendance: 1,527
Referee: Meir Levi (Israel)
21 July 2011
19:00

Vorskla Poltava (Ukraine)	3–0	(Northern Ireland) Glentoran
Januzi 33', 73'; Kurylov 36'	Report

Butovsky Vorskla Stadium, Poltava
Attendance: 8,000
Referee: Richard Trutz (Slovakia)

Vorskla Poltava won 5–0 on aggregate.

14 July 2011
20:30

Juvenes/Dogana (San Marino)	0–1	(North Macedonia) Rabotnicki
	Report	Petkovski 86'

Stadio Olimpico, Serravalle
Attendance: 311
Referee: Huw Jones (Wales)
21 July 2011
20:00

Rabotnicki (North Macedonia)	3–0	(San Marino) Juvenes/Dogana
Manevski 35'; Petkovski 50'; Petrovic 56'	Report

Philip II Arena, Skopje
Attendance: 1,000
Referee: Sandor Szabo (Hungary)

Rabotnicki won 4–0 on aggregate.

14 July 2011
19:00

Örebro SK (Sweden)	0–0	(Bosnia and Herzegovina) Sarajevo
	Report

Behrn Arena, Örebro
Attendance: 5,529
Referee: Jérome Efong Nzolo (Belgium)
21 July 2011
19:00

Sarajevo (Bosnia and Herzegovina)	2–0	(Sweden) Örebro SK
Haskić 47', 62'	Report

Asim Ferhatović Hase Stadium, Sarajevo
Attendance: 10,527
Referee: Ruddy Buquet (France)

Sarajevo won 2–0 on aggregate.

14 July 2011
20:45

Crusaders (Northern Ireland)	1–3	(England) Fulham
Adamson 54'	Report	Briggs 39'; Zamora 74'; Murphy 77' (pen.)

Seaview, Belfast
Attendance: 2,477
Referee: Clément Turpin (France)
21 July 2011
20:30

Fulham (England)	4–0	(Northern Ireland) Crusaders
Johnson 19'; Duff 56'; Zamora 66'; Sidwell 70'	Report

Craven Cottage, London
Attendance: 15,676
Referee: Marios Stamatis (Cyprus)

Fulham won 7–1 on aggregate.

14 July 2011
19:50

Llanelli (Wales)	2–1	(Georgia (country)) Dinamo Tbilisi
Follows 8', 51'	Report	Odikadze 81' (pen.)

Parc y Scarlets, Llanelli (Note: Llanelli played their home match at Parc y Scarlets, Llanelli as their own Stebonheath Park did not meet the UEFA criteria.)
Attendance: 643
Referee: Mattias Gestranius (Finland)
21 July 2011
19:00

Dinamo Tbilisi (Georgia (country))	5–0	(Wales) Llanelli
Xisco 7', 51'; Yagüe 11'; Robertinho 27'; Coto 55'	Report

Boris Paichadze Stadium, Tbilisi
Attendance: 18,027
Referee: Martin Strömbergsson (Sweden)

Dinamo Tbilisi won 6–2 on aggregate.

14 July 2011
19:30

Floriana (Malta)	0–8	(Cyprus) AEK Larnaca
	Report	Mrdaković 4'; Pavlou 12'; Gonzalo García 24', 42', 53'; Linssen 36'; Gómez 74'; Mitidis 84'

Hibernians Ground, Paola
Attendance: 851
Referee: Emir Alecković (Bosnia and Herzegovina)
21 July 2011
19:00

AEK Larnaca (Cyprus)	1–0	(Malta) Floriana
Pavlou 26'	Report

Neo GSZ Stadium, Larnaca
Attendance: 1,413
Referee: Arman Amirkhanyan (Armenia)

AEK Larnaca won 9–0 on aggregate.

14 July 2011
19:00

Shakhtyor Soligorsk (Belarus)	0–1	(Latvia) Ventspils
	Report	Kosmačovs 89'

Stroitel Stadium, Salihorsk
Attendance: 3,020
Referee: Tamás Bognár (Hungary)
21 July 2011
17:30

Ventspils (Latvia)	3–2	(Belarus) Shakhtyor Soligorsk
Mvondo 52', 79' (pen.); Martínez 90+3'	Report	Kolomyts 6'; Komarovski 73'

Ventspils Olimpiskais Stadions, Ventspils
Attendance: 2,500
Referee: Espen Berntsen (Norway)

Ventspils won 4–2 on aggregate.

14 July 2011
17:30

Flamurtari (Albania)	0–2	(Czech Republic) Jablonec
	Report	Lafata 70', 75'

Flamurtari Stadium, Vlorë
Attendance: 2,700
Referee: Sergei Karasev (Russia)
21 July 2011
20:00

Jablonec (Czech Republic)	5–1	(Albania) Flamurtari
Kovařík 25', 70'; Piták 30', 61'; Lafata 55'	Report	Sakaj 36' (pen.)

Stadion Střelnice, Jablonec nad Nisou
Attendance: 3,095
Referee: Lars Christoffersen (Denmark)

Jablonec won 7–1 on aggregate.

14 July 2011
21:15

KR (Iceland)	3–0	(Slovakia) Žilina
B. Guðjónsson 25'; Arnarsson 51'; Finnbogason 55' (pen.)	Report

KR-völlur, Reykjavík
Attendance: 1,234
Referee: Gerhard Grobelnik (Austria)
21 July 2011
19:30

Žilina (Slovakia)	2–0	(Iceland) KR
Majtán 29'; Ceesay 70'	Report

Štadión pod Dubňom, Žilina
Attendance: 3,412
Referee: Ken Henry Johnsen (Norway)

KR won 3–2 on aggregate.

14 July 2011
19:00

Vålerenga (Norway)	1–0	(Armenia) Mika
Berre 68'	Report

Ullevål Stadion, Oslo
Attendance: 2,312
Referee: Boško Jovanetić (Serbia)
21 July 2011
15:00

Mika (Armenia)	0–1	(Norway) Vålerenga
	Report	Dos Santos 49'

Mika Stadium, Yerevan
Attendance: 2,350
Referee: David Mckeon (Republic of Ireland)

Vålerenga won 2–0 on aggregate.

14 July 2011
20:00

Olimpija Ljubljana (Slovenia)	2–0	(Republic of Ireland) Bohemians
Vršič 45+2' (pen.), 76'	Report

Stožice Stadium, Ljubljana
Attendance: 6,000
Referee: Carlos Xistra (Portugal)
21 July 2011
20:45

Bohemians (Republic of Ireland)	1–1	(Slovenia) Olimpija Ljubljana
Fagan 34'	Report	O'Brien 81' (o.g.)

Dalymount Park, Dublin
Attendance: 1,802
Referee: Paolo Silvio Mazzoleni (Italy)

Olimpija Ljubljana won 3–1 on aggregate.

14 July 2011
20:45

Domžale (Slovenia)	1–2	(Croatia) RNK Split
Pekič 47' (pen.)	Report	Čop 41'; Vitaić 76'

Sports Park, Domžale
Attendance: 1,000
Referee: César Muñiz Fernández (Spain)
21 July 2011
20:30

RNK Split (Croatia)	3–1	(Slovenia) Domžale
Čop 47'; Vidić 72'; Milović 85'	Report	Horvat 46'

Stadion Hrvatski vitezovi, Dugopolje (Note: RNK Split played their home match at Stadion Hrvatski vitezovi, Dugopolje as their own Stadion Park mladeži did not meet the UEFA criteria.)
Attendance: 2,600
Referee: Deniz Aytekin (Germany)

RNK Split won 5–2 on aggregate.

14 July 2011
20:00

Differdange 03 (Luxembourg)	0–0	(Estonia) Levadia Tallinn
	Report

Stade Josy Barthel, Luxembourg City (Note: Differdange 03 played their home match at Stade Josy Barthel, Luxembourg City as their own Stade du Thillenberg did not meet the UEFA criteria.)
Attendance: 674
Referee: Vusal Aliyev (Azerbaijan)
21 July 2011
17:45

Levadia Tallinn (Estonia)	0–1	(Luxembourg) Differdange 03
	Report	Lebresne 32'

A. Le Coq Arena, Tallinn (Note: Levadia Tallinn played their home match at A. Le Coq Arena, Tallinn as it has a greater capacity than their own Kadrioru Stadium.)
Attendance: 1,550
Referee: Lorenc Jemini (Albania)

Differdange 03 won 1–0 on aggregate.

14 July 2011
20:00

Tirana (Albania)	0–0	(Slovakia) Spartak Trnava
	Report

Qemal Stafa Stadium, Tirana (Note: Tirana played their home match at Qemal Stafa Stadium, Tirana as it has a greater capacity than their own Selman Stërmasi Stadium.)
Attendance: 4,000
Referee: Vladimir Kazmenko (Russia)
21 July 2011
19:00

Spartak Trnava (Slovakia)	3–1	(Albania) Tirana
Tomaček 41', 85' (pen.); Procházka 66'	Report	G. Lika 22'

Štadión Antona Malatinského, Trnava
Attendance: 6,182
Referee: Dawid Piasecki (Poland)

Spartak Trnava won 3–1 on aggregate.

14 July 2011
19:00

Ferencváros (Hungary)	2–1	(Norway) Aalesund
Oláh 38'; Abdi 56'	Report	Okoronkwo 27'

Stadion Albert Flórián, Budapest
Attendance: 8,000
Referee: Marius Avram (Romania)
21 July 2011
19:00

Aalesund (Norway)	3–1 (a.e.t.)	(Hungary) Ferencváros
Barrantes 72' (pen.); Fuhre 87'; Post 119'	Report	Oláh 42'

Color Line Stadion, Ålesund
Attendance: 5,122
Referee: Szymon Marciniak (Poland)

Aalesund won 4–3 on aggregate.

14 July 2011
20:30

Liepājas Metalurgs (Latvia)	1–4	(Austria) Red Bull Salzburg
Kalns 61'	Report	Alan 22', 44', 45+1'; Cziommer 89'

Daugava Stadium, Liepāja
Attendance: 1,750
Referee: Raymond Crangle (Northern Ireland)
21 July 2011
19:00

Red Bull Salzburg (Austria)	0–0	(Latvia) Liepājas Metalurgs
	Report

Red Bull Arena, Wals-Siezenheim
Attendance: 5,100
Referee: Danny Desmond Makkelie (Netherlands)

Red Bull Salzburg won 4–1 on aggregate.

14 July 2011
17:00

Rad (Serbia)	0–1	(Greece) Olympiacos Volos
	Report	Martín 87'

Stadion FK Obilić, Belgrade
Attendance: 2,300
Referee: Babak Rafati (Germany)
21 July 2011
20:00

Olympiacos Volos (Greece)	1–1	(Serbia) Rad
Martín 79' (pen.)	Report	Kojić 47'

Panthessaliko Stadium, Volos
Attendance: 5,994
Referee: Daniel Stålhammar (Sweden)

Olympiacos Volos won 2–1 on aggregate.

14 July 2011
20:00

The New Saints (Wales)	1–3	(Denmark) Midtjylland
Evans 59'	Report	Hassan 65'; Olsen 86' (pen.); Albæk 90+3'

Park Hall, Oswestry
Attendance: 914
Referee: Mihaly Fabian (Hungary)
21 July 2011
19:15

Midtjylland (Denmark)	5–2	(Wales) The New Saints
Igboun 23'; Nworuh 24', 52'; Olsen 32' (pen.); Hvilsom 90+1'	Report	Darlington 55', 90'

MCH Arena, Herning
Attendance: 2,650
Referee: Levan Kvaratskhelia (Georgia)

Midtjylland won 8–3 on aggregate.

14 July 2011
20:15

Kecskemét (Hungary)	1–1	(Kazakhstan) Aktobe
Radanović 23'	Report	Mane 59'

Széktói Stadion, Kecskemét
Attendance: 3,400
Referee: Liran Liany (Israel)
21 July 2011
18:00

Aktobe (Kazakhstan)	0–0	(Hungary) Kecskemét
	Report

Aktobe Central Stadium, Aktobe
Attendance: 12,500
Referee: Sergiy Boiko (Ukraine)

1–1 on aggregate; Aktobe won on away goals.

14 July 2011
19:00

BK Häcken (Sweden)	1–0	(Finland) Honka
Ranégie 36' (pen.)	Report

Örjans Vall, Halmstad (Note: BK Häcken played their home match at Örjans Vall, Halmstad as their own Rambergsvallen did not meet the UEFA criteria.)
Attendance: 448
Referee: David Fernández Borbalán (Spain)
21 July 2011
18:00

Honka (Finland)	0–2	(Sweden) BK Häcken
	Report	Chibuike 42'; Forsell 85'

ISS Stadion, Vantaa
Attendance: 2,216
Referee: Vladimir Vnuk (Slovakia)

BK Häcken won 3–0 on aggregate.

14 July 2011
19:00

Anorthosis Famagusta (Cyprus)	3–0	(Georgia (country)) Gagra
Vučićević 8'; Rezek 35', 71'	Report

Antonis Papadopoulos Stadium, Larnaca
Attendance: 6,450
Referee: Radek Matějek (Czech Republic)
21 July 2011
19:00

Gagra (Georgia (country))	2–0	(Cyprus) Anorthosis Famagusta
Gabedava 6'; Tkeshelashvili 40'	Report

David Abashidze Stadium, Zestafoni (Note: Gagra played their home match at David Abashidze Stadium, Zestafoni as they don't play at their own city Gagra since the 1992–93 Georgia-Abkhazia conflict.)
Attendance: 735
Referee: Peter Sippel (Germany)

Anorthosis Famagusta won 3–2 on aggregate.

14 July 2011
20:00

Vaduz (Liechtenstein)	0–2	(Serbia) Vojvodina
	Report	Oumarou 60'; Ilić 70'

Rheinpark Stadion, Vaduz
Attendance: 1,892
Referee: Stavros Tritsonis (Greece)
21 July 2011
17:00

Vojvodina (Serbia)	1–3	(Liechtenstein) Vaduz
Čović 88'	Report	Cvetinović 10'; Merenda 78', 90+6'

Stadion Karađorđe, Novi Sad
Attendance: 6,800
Referee: Sergey Tsinkevich (Belarus)

3–3 on aggregate; Vaduz won on away goals.

14 July 2011
18:00

Rudar Pljevlja (Montenegro)	0–3	Austria Wien
	Report	Barazite 35', 63'; Jun 76'

Gradski stadion, Nikšić (Note: Rudar Pljevlja played their home match at Gradski stadion, Nikšić as their own Gradski stadion did not meet the UEFA criteria.)
Attendance: 1,150
Referee: Mauro Bergonzi (Italy)
21 July 2011
21:05

Austria Wien	2–0	(Montenegro) Rudar Pljevlja
Barazite 44'; Jun 75'	Report

Franz Horr Stadium, Vienna
Attendance: 5,100
Referee: Olivier Thual (France)

Austria Wien won 5–0 on aggregate.

14 July 2011
16:45

Śląsk Wrocław (Poland)	1–0	(Scotland) Dundee United
Voskamp 75'	Report

Stadion Oporowska, Wrocław
Attendance: 8,300
Referee: Tom Harald Hagen (Norway)
21 July 2011
20:45

Dundee United (Scotland)	3–2	(Poland) Śląsk Wrocław
Russell 2'; Goodwillie 5'; Daly 44' (pen.)	Report	Elsner 14'; Dudek 74'

Tannadice Park, Dundee
Attendance: 11,306
Referee: Antonio Mateu Lahoz (Spain)

3–3 on aggregate; Śląsk Wrocław won on away goals.

14 July 2011
15:00

Shakhter Karagandy (Kazakhstan)	2–1	(Republic of Ireland) St Patrick's Athletic
Vasiljević 52', 86'	Report	D. McMillan 79'

Stadion Shakhter, Karagandy
Attendance: 12,000
Referee: Kristo Tohver (Estonia)
21 July 2011
20:45

St Patrick's Athletic (Republic of Ireland)	2–0	(Kazakhstan) Shakhter Karagandy
E. McMillan 14'; Doyle 70'	Report

Richmond Park, Dublin
Attendance: 2,250
Referee: Sébastien Delferiere (Belgium)

Nacional won 3–1 on aggregate.

14 July 2011
20:00

EB/Streymur (Faroe Islands)	1–1	(Azerbaijan) Qarabağ
A. Hansen 90+3'	Report	Aliyev 11'

Gundadalur, Tórshavn (Note: EB/Streymur played their home match at Gundadalur, Tórshavn as their own Við Margáir did not meet the UEFA criteria.)
Attendance: 735
Referee: Mark Steven Whitby (Wales)
21 July 2011
18:00

Qarabağ (Azerbaijan)	0–0	(Faroe Islands) EB/Streymur
	Report

Tofiq Bahramov Stadium, Baku
Attendance: 17,387
Referee: Goran Spirkoski (Macedonia)

1–1 on aggregate; Qarabağ won on away goals.

14 July 2011
21:15

FH (Iceland)	1–1	(Portugal) Nacional
Bjarnason 67'	Report	Costa 45+1'

Kaplakriki, Hafnarfjörður
Attendance: 1,140
Referee: Radek Příhoda (Czech Republic)
21 July 2011
20:45

Nacional (Portugal)	2–0	(Iceland) FH
Luís Alberto 55'; Candeias 90'	Report

Estádio da Madeira, Funchal
Attendance: 4,783
Referee: Alan Black (Northern Ireland)

Nacional won 3–1 on aggregate.

14 July 2011
20:00

Paks (Hungary)	1–1	(Norway) Tromsø
Vayer 57'	Report	Drage 26'

Stadion Sóstói, Székesfehérvár
Attendance: 1,800
Referee: João Capela (Portugal)
21 July 2011
19:00

Tromsø (Norway)	0–3	(Hungary) Paks
	Report	Kiss 59', 77'; Böde 62'

Alfheim Stadion, Tromsø
Attendance: 2,710
Referee: Yunus Yıldırım (Turkey)

Paks won 4–1 on aggregate.

14 July 2011
18:00

TPS (Finland)	0–1	(Belgium) Westerlo
	Report	Cabeke 90+3'

Veritas Stadion, Turku
Attendance: 3,197
Referee: Aleksei Eskov (Russia)
21 July 2011
20:00

Westerlo (Belgium)	0–0	(Finland) TPS
	Report

Het Kuipje, Westerlo
Attendance: 2,814
Referee: Artur Soares (Portugal)

Westerlo won 1–0 on aggregate.

14 July 2011
19:30

Maccabi Tel Aviv (Israel)	3–1	(Azerbaijan) Khazar Lankaran
Konaté 22'; Atar 39'; Israilevich 44'	Report	Mureşan 45+1'

Bloomfield Stadium, Tel Aviv
Attendance: 8,352
Referee: Ilias Spathas (Greece)
21 July 2011
17:30

Khazar Lankaran (Azerbaijan)	0–0	(Israel) Maccabi Tel Aviv
	Report

Lankaran City Stadium, Lankaran
Attendance: 15,000
Referee: Andriy Shandor (Ukraine)

Maccabi Tel Aviv won 3–1 on aggregate.

14 July 2011
20:30

Vllaznia (Albania)	0–0	(Switzerland) Thun
	Report

Loro Boriçi Stadium, Shkodër
Attendance: 6,000
Referee: Igor Pristovnik (Croatia)
21 July 2011
19:30

Thun (Switzerland)	2–1	(Albania) Vllaznia
Rama 89'; Lüthi 90+2'	Report	Sukaj 14'

Stadion Lachen, Thun
Attendance: 7,193
Referee: João Ferreira (Portugal)

Thun won 2–1 on aggregate.
