= List of archives in Greece =

This is list of archives in Greece.

== Archives in Greece ==
- General Archives of the State
- Greek Film Archive

== See also ==
- List of archives
- List of museums in Greece
- Culture of Greece
- List of libraries in Greece
