= Lambrakis =

Lambrakis (Greek: Λαμπράκης) is a Greek surname. It is the surname of:

- Andreas Lambrakis, Greek professional wrestler.
- Christos Lambrakis (1934–2009), Greek journalist and publisher.
- Dimitrios Lambrakis (1886–1957), Greek journalist and publisher.
- Grigoris Lambrakis (1912–1963), Greek athlete, peace activist and politician.

== See also ==
- Grigoris Lambrakis Stadium, association football stadium in Kallithea, Greece.
- Lambrakis Democratic Youth, Greek leftist youth organization named after Grigoris Lambrakis.
- Lambrakis Press Group, Greek media company founded by Christos Lambrakis.
- Stade Georges Lambrakis, association football stadium in Le Port, Réunion.
