= List of libraries in Greece =

This is a list of libraries in Greece.

== Libraries by region ==
=== Attica ===
- Athens Municipality Library (Central Library of the City of Athens)
- Library of the National Documentation Centre (EKT)
- Athens Comics Library
- Benaki Museum
- Gennadius Library, Athens
- Library of the National Observatory of Athens
- Eugenides Foundation Library
- Lending Library of Aikaterini Laskaridis Foundation
- Hellenic Library of the Onassis Foundation, Athens
- Lilian Voudouri Music Library of Greece, Athens
- National Hellenic Research Foundation - Libraries, Athens
- NKUA Library, Athens
- Library of the Technical Chamber of Greece (TEE)
- Library of the Hellenic Parliament,
- General State Archives Library
- National Library of Greece, Athens
- Hellenic Literary and Historical Archive (ELIA). It was founded in 1980. Since 2009, it has been part of the National Bank of Greece Cultural Foundation (MIET).
- Nordic Library at Athens
- Panteion University - Library and Information Center, Athens
- University of Piraeus Library (in Greek),
- Piraeus Municipal Library
- Library of the Piraeus Bank Group Cultural Foundation (PIOP)
- Library of the Byzantine and Christian Museum, Athens
- Library of the Academy of Athens
- Library of the National Center for Social Research (EKKE)
- Library of Hellenic-American Union
- Octave Merlier Library of the French Institute
- Library of the Goethe Institute
- Library of the Instituto Cervantes
- Library of the Italian Cultural Institute
- Library of the Greek Film Archive
- Library of the National Theatre of Greece
- Great Music Library of Greece
- Library of the Athens School of Fine Arts
- Library of the Panteion University
- Library of the School of Philosophy at the EKPA

=== Central Macedonia ===
- Aristotle University of Thessaloniki - Library and Information Centre (in Greek), Thessaloniki
- University of Macedonia - Library and Information Center, Thessaloniki
- Museum of Byzantine Culture, Thessaloniki
- National Map Library, Thessaloniki
- Central Public Library of Serres, Serres
- Municipal Library of Katerini, Katerini
- Veria Central Public Library (in Greek), Veria
- Library of the Association of Asia Minor of Pieria, Katerini
- Varnavios Library of the Metropolis of Kitros, Katerini and Platamon, Katerini
- BIBON - Bibliotecha Oenologica, Naoussa. Greece’s first Bibliotecha Oenologica. A wine library houses at Wine and Vine Museum by the Boutaris Foundation, in collaboration with the Public Central Library of Veria and the non-profit civil partnership Future Library.

=== Crete ===
- Technical University of Crete - Library and Information Centre (in Greek)
- Vikelaia Library, Heraklion

=== Epirus ===
- Municipal Library of Preveza, Preveza

=== Ionian Islands ===
- Argostoli Public Library, Argostoli
- Zakynthos Public Library, Zakynthos

=== Mount Athos ===
- Koutloumousiou Monastery - Library
- Xenophontos Monastery - Library
- Zograf Monastery - Library

=== North Aegean ===
- Samos Public Central and Historical Library, Samos

=== South Aegean ===
- Hafiz Ahmed Agha Library, Rhodes

=== Thessaly ===
- Monastery of Great Meteoron - Library, Kalabaka
- University of Thessaly Library, Volos

=== Western Greece ===
- Hellenic Open University - Library and Information Center (in Greek), Patras
- University of Patras - Library and Information Center (in Greek), Patras

=== Western Macedonia ===
- Municipal Library of Kozani, Kozani

== Defunct ==
- Hadrian's Library, Athens
- Library of Pantainos, Athens

== See also ==
- List of Foreign Archaeological Institutes in Greece
- Access to public information in Greece
- List of archives in Greece
- Open access in Greece
- Greek literature
- Libraries in ancient Greece (in Greek)
- Special libraries in Greece (in Greek)
- Academic libraries in Greece (in Greek)
- Greek libraries on the Internet (in Greek)
