= Marinakis =

Marinakis (Greek: Μαρινάκης) is a surname. Notable people with the surname include:

- Evangelos Marinakis (born 1967), Greek businessman, with interests in shipping, media and football
- Miltiadis Marinakis (1930–1999), Greek shipowner and politician, father of Evangelos
- Nikos Marinakis (born 1993), Greek professional footballer
