= Hadrian's Library =

Roman library in Athens, Greece

- Βιβλιοθήκη του Αδριανού (Greek)
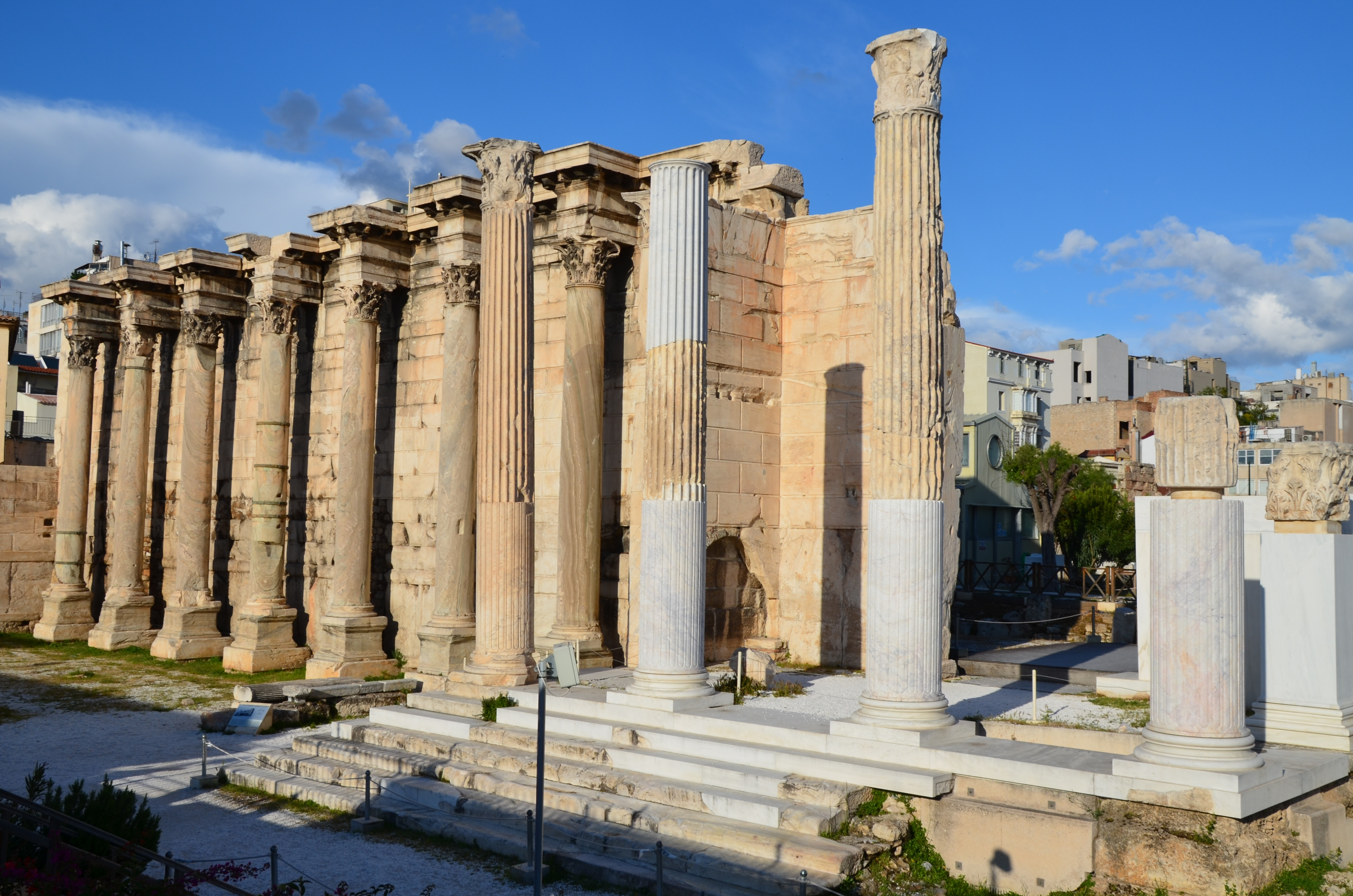
- West wall of the Library of Hadrian

- Location within Athens
- 37°58′32″N 23°43′34″E
- Type: Library
- Periods: Classical era
- Cultures: Ancient Greece, Ancient Rome
- Associated with: Emperor Hadrian
- Location: Greece
- Region: Athens

History
- Built: 132 AD

Site notes
- Material: Marble
- Owner: Public property
- Management: Minister for Culture
- Public access: Monastiraki station

Hadrian's Library is the ruin of a monumental building created by Roman Emperor Hadrian in AD 132 on the north side of the Acropolis of Athens.

The main entrance to the library was part of the Stoa of Hadrian with columns of Karystian marble and Pentelic capitals. The library opened to the Roman agora (oil market), by a porch and pediment.

The building followed a Roman forum architectural style, having only one entrance with a propylon of Corinthian order, a high surrounding wall with protruding niches (oikoi, exedrae) at its long sides, an inner courtyard surrounded by columns and a decorative oblong pool in the middle. The library was on the eastern side where cupboards and shelves containing rolls of papyrus "books" were kept. Adjoining halls were used as reading rooms, and the corners served as lecture halls.

The ceilings were gilded wood and the walls covered in marble and paintings.

The library was seriously damaged by the Herulian invasion of 267 and repaired by the prefect Herculius in 407–412.

The library was later incorporated into the Roman city walls.

During Byzantine times, three churches were built at the site, the remains of which are preserved:

- a tetraconch (5th century)
- a three-aisled basilica (7th century), and
- a simple cathedral (12th century), which was the first cathedral of the city, known as Megali Panagia.

Around the same period as the cathedral another church, Agios Asomatos sta Skalia, was built against the north facade, but it is not preserved. A colossal statue of the goddess Nike/Victoria is exhibited on the site, excavated in the Library in 1988.

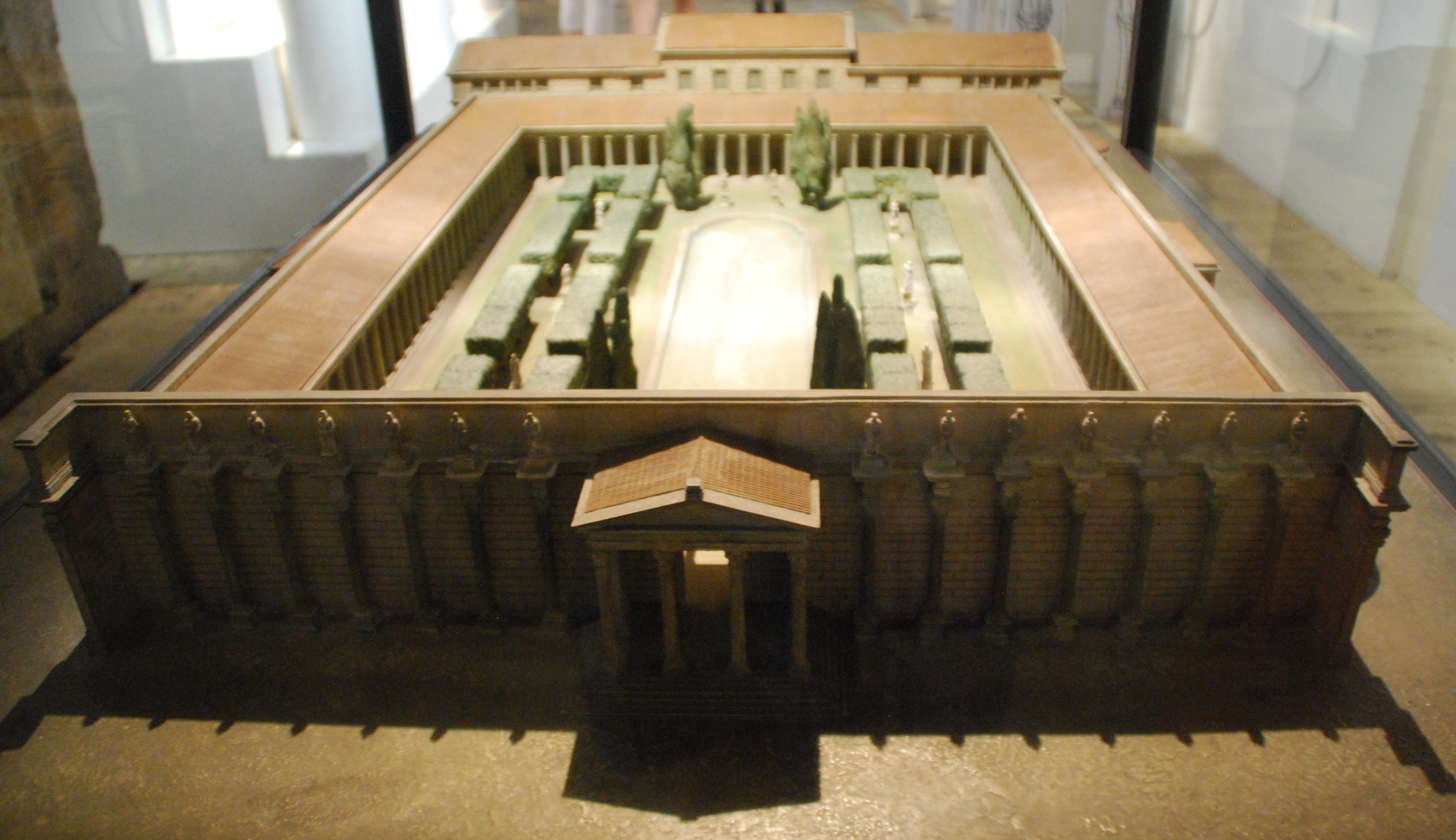
Library of Hadrian – Model in Colosseum

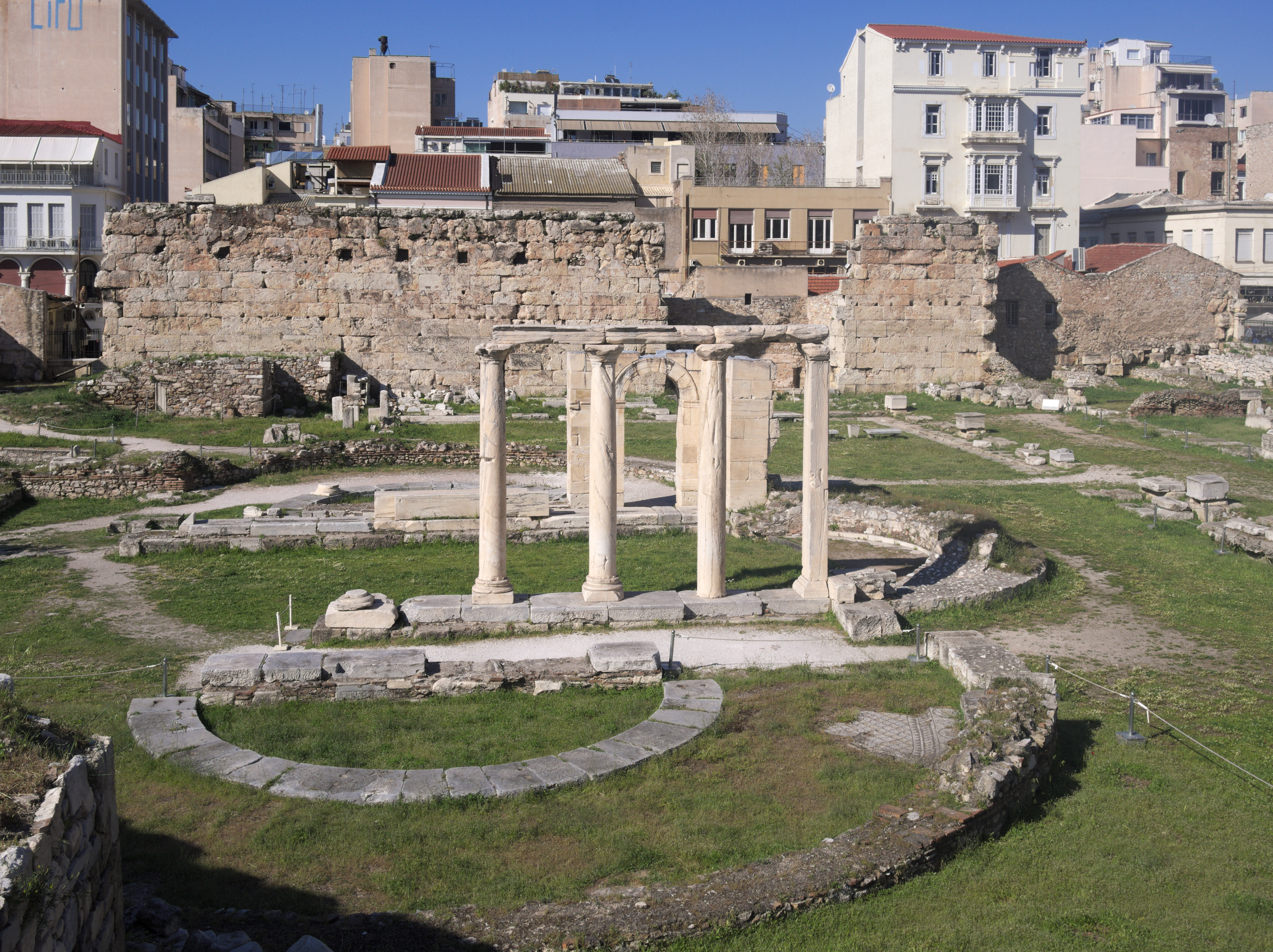
View from south: the tetraconch in the courtyard

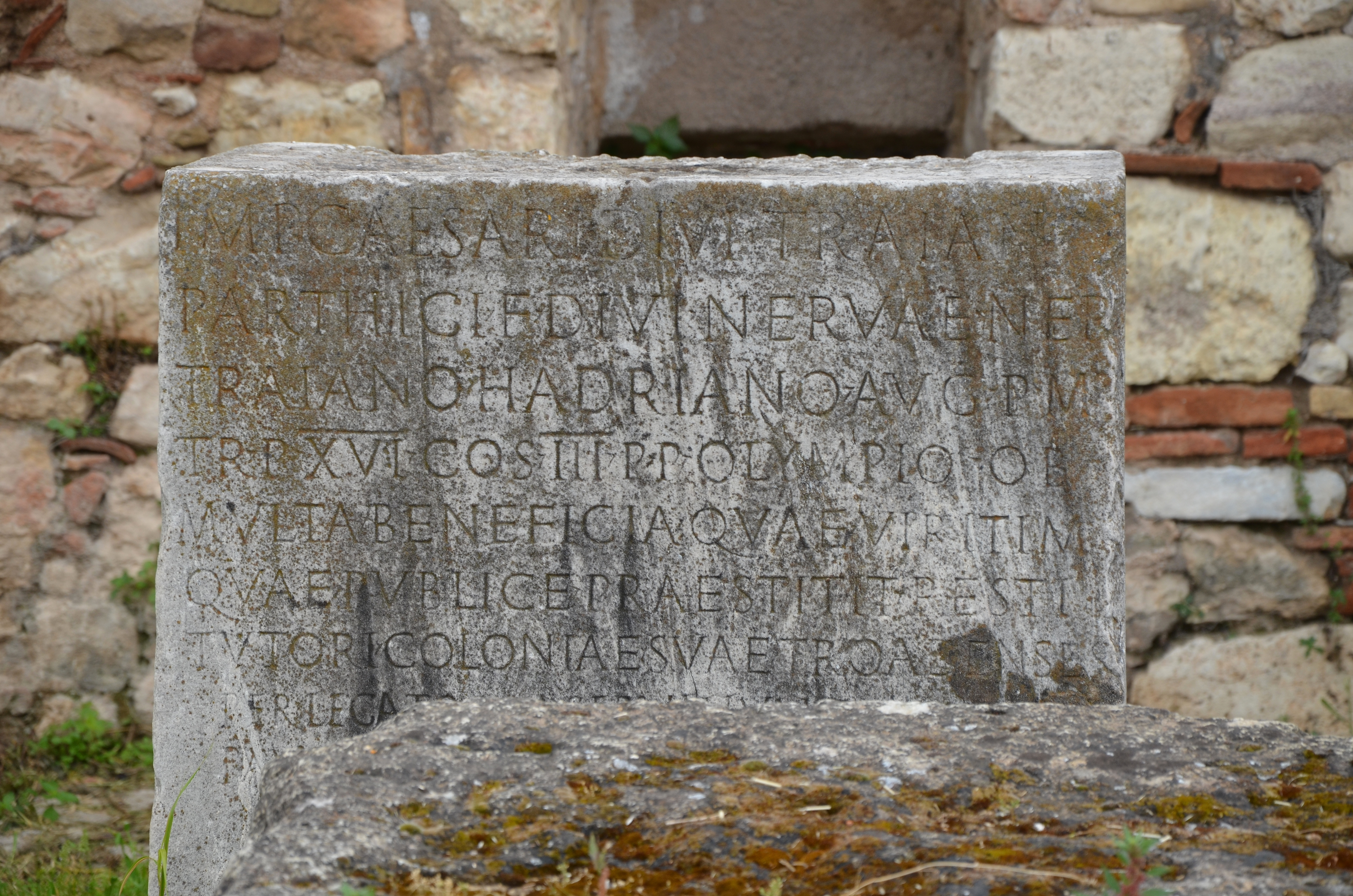
Stone inscription inside the library honouring Hadrian

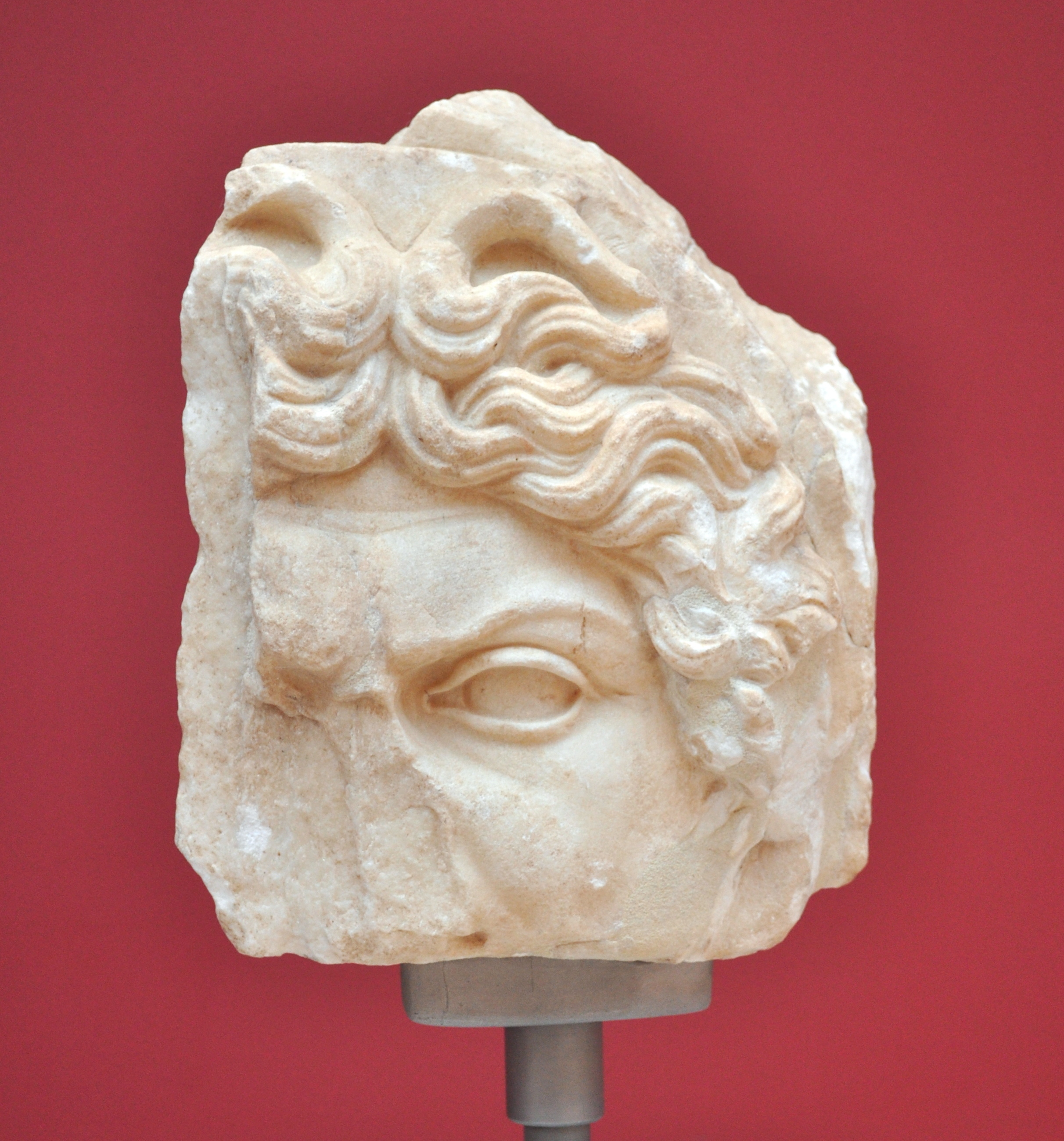
Relief fragment of a Gorgoneion. Museum at Hadrian's Library. 2nd century

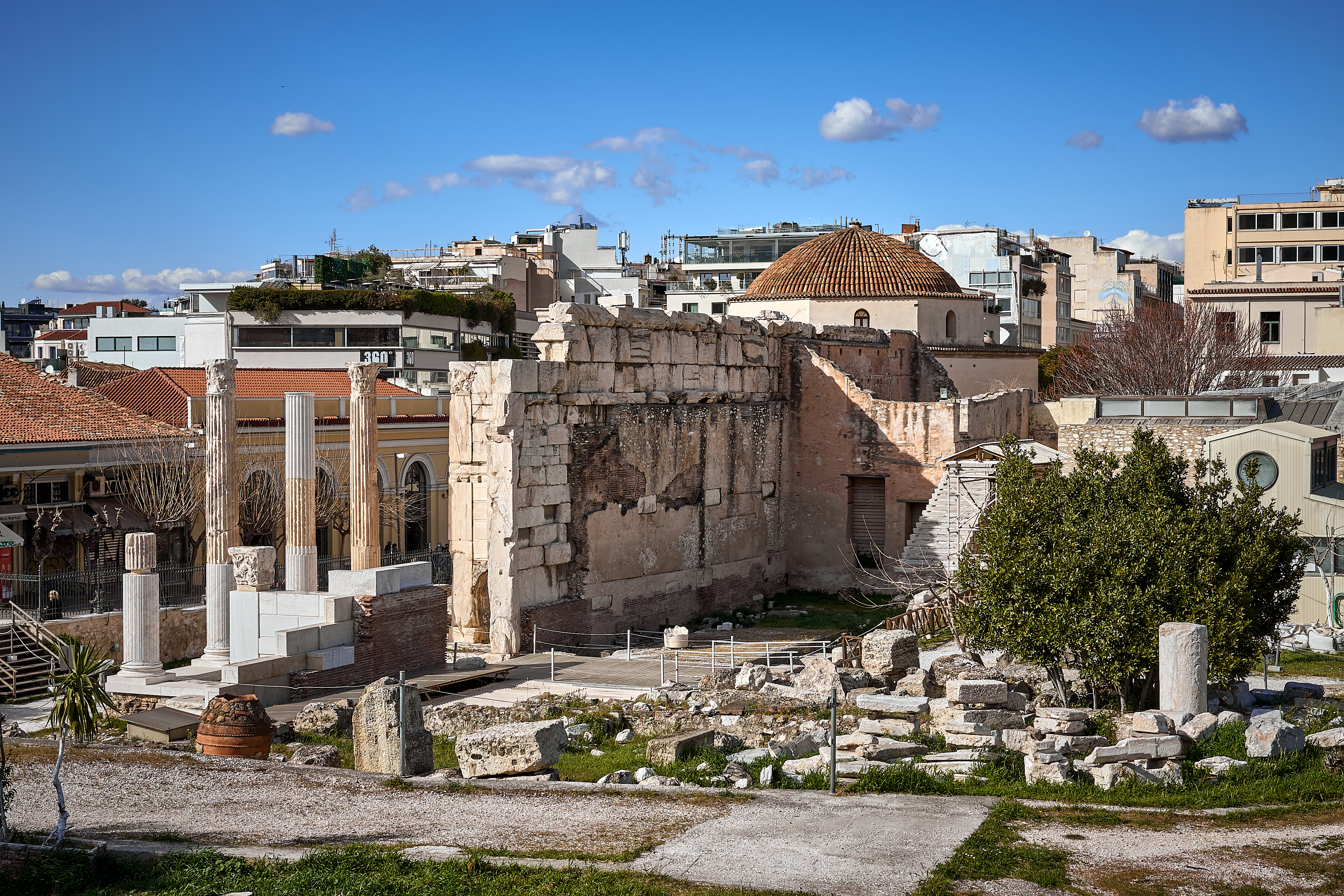
The rear of the entrance

== See also ==
- Library of Pantainos
- List of libraries in Greece
