= Central Public Library =

Central Public Library may refer to:

- Central Public Library (Dhaka), the largest public library in Bangladesh
- Central Public Library of Serres
- Central Public Library (Washington, D.C.), United States
