= In.gr =

Greek news website

- Type: News site
- Format: Online
- Owner: Alter Ego Media S.A.
- Founded: November 1999
- Headquarters: Athens, Greece
- Website: www.in.gr

In.gr is a Greek news site. The site was owned by Lambrakis Press Group, of which the assets were acquired in 2017 by Alter Ego Media S.A. The content is written in the Greek language and the site has existed since November 1999. In.gr is among the most visited news websites in Greece.

== Content ==
The site is described by its owning company as "the largest Internet portal that operates in Greece". The site contains news from Greece and around the World, opinions, city guides, coverage of various special interests such as cars, technology, cinema, music, health, and free services, such as email.
