= Public Art Festival =

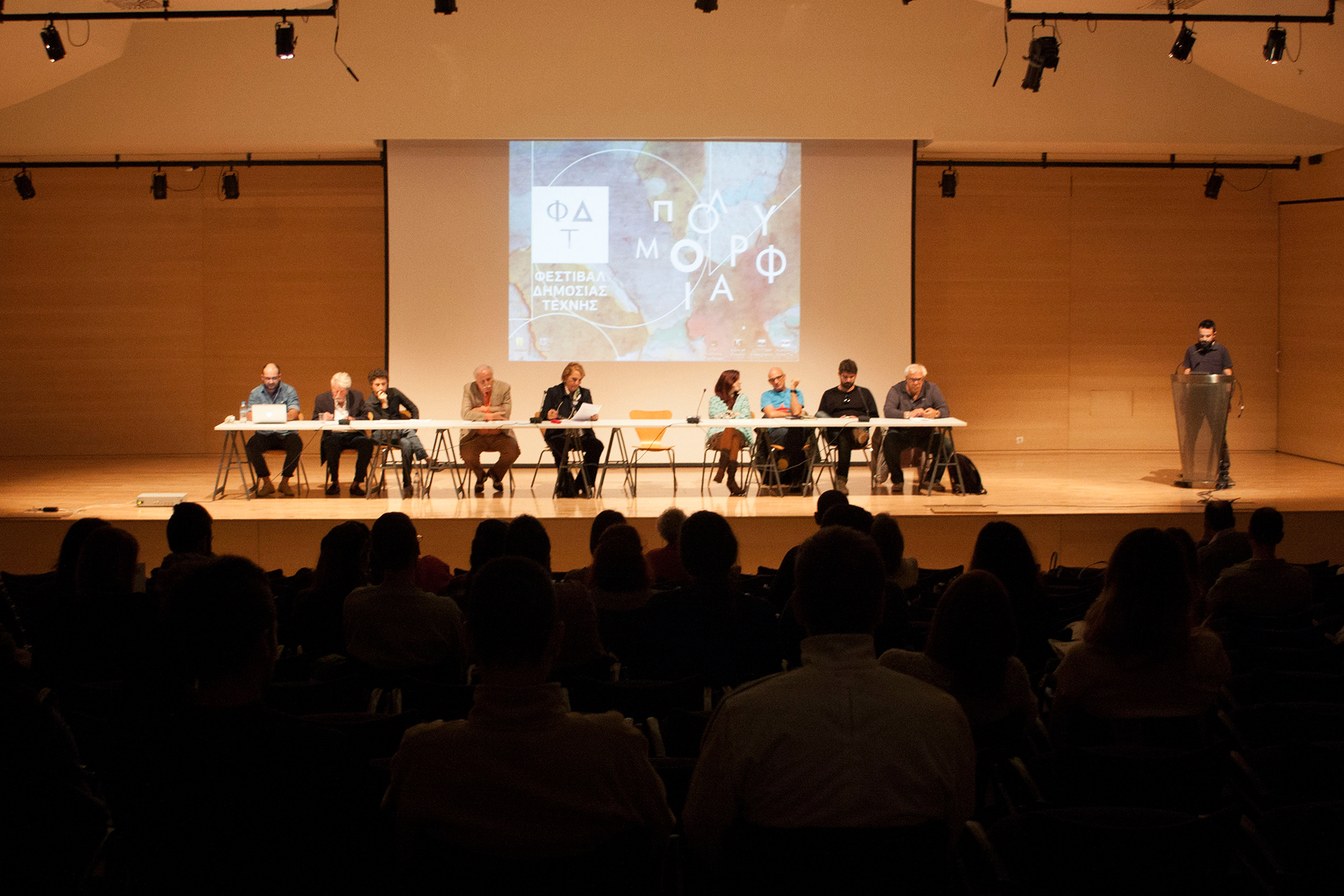
The conference "Multiformity: Art in Public Space" at the conference hall of the Piraeus st. annexe of the Benaki Museum. The 1st action of the 1st edition of Public Art Festival. From left to right: Dimitris Ginosatis, Ioannis Vikelas, Alexis Vikelas, Leonidas-Phoebus Koskos, Yiouli Rapti, Konstantina Drakopoulou, Poka-Yio, b., Kostas Theologou and Andreas Fakis. Photo by Nia Hefe Filiogianni

Public Art Festival is a biennial cultural framework, established in Athens, Greece by Andreas Fakis for the independent cultural organization Studio 4 in order to showcase forms of visual arts, conceptual art and film that fall into the public sphere.

Public Art Festival took place for the first time in Athens during September - October 2014, under the theme of "Multiformity". The first edition of PAF was curated by Andreas Fakis, was spread out in three venues, namely: the Benaki Museum, the Greek Film Archive - Film Museum and Romantso and several outdoor locations, including Filopappou Hill, where the press conference of PAF took place and several walls, where murals were created and conserved.
