= Athens Concert Hall =

Coordinates: 37°58′52″N 23°45′15″E

- Μέγαρο Μουσικής Αθηνών

- Interactive map of the Athens Concert Hall area

General information
- Type: Concert hall
- Architectural style: Modern
- Location: Vas. Sofias & Kokkali, Athens, Greece
- Opened: March 20, 1991; 35 years ago

Design and construction
- Architects: Emmanouil Vourekas, Kyriakos Kyriakidis, Kostas Sgoutas

Other information
- Seating capacity: Christos Lambrakis Hall: 1,960; Alexandra Trianti Hall: 1,500; Dimitris Mitropoulos Hall: 450; Nikos Skalkotas Hall: 400

Website
- www.megaron.gr

The Athens Concert Hall (Greek: Μέγαρον Μουσικής Αθηνών, Mégaron Mousikis Athinon) is a concert hall located on Vasilissis Sofias Avenue in Athens, Greece.

The Hall was inaugurated in 1991 with two halls. Since then it has been augmented with two more halls and now has a total of four: two large and two smaller ones. The Hall has optimal facilities for opera performances, and some operas are presented every season.

The Megaro Moussikis station of the Athens Metro is just outside the Hall, on Line 3.

The design of the 8,000 square meters floor was performed by Christopher Alexander; the process of designing and laying the floor and its result are described in his work The Nature of Order: An Essay on the Art of Building and the Nature of the Universe.

== Performance venues and other facilities ==
- The Christos Lambrakis Hall (named after the ex-president of the "Friends of Music" Society, Christos Lambrakis, and previously called "Friends of Music" Hall) was designed by Heinrich Keilholz whose plan was altered later to its existing by architect Helias Skourbelos and the acoustics were developed by Theodore Timagenis. It has a capacity of 1,961, and is used for concerts and recitals. It also holds the biggest pipe organ in Greece, with 6,080 pipes, constructed by Klais Orgelbau.
- The Dimitris Mitropoulos Hall (named after the conductor, Dimitri Mitropoulos), which has a capacity of 494 and is usually used for Chamber Music and dance performances.

In 2004 the International Conference Centre opened at the Athens Concert Hall, adding:

- The Alexandra Trianti Hall (named after lieder singer Alexándra Triántē), which has a capacity of 1,750 and is used for operas, ballet and other musical performances,
- The Nikos Skalkottas Hall (named after composer Nikos Skalkottas), a smaller hall for concerts and conferences, and
- The Lilian Voudouri Music Library of Greece, established in 1995. It currently incorporates 126,000 titles and multimedia resources.

== See also ==
- List of concert halls
