= Christos Lambrakis =

Greek businessman

Christos Dimitriou Lambrakis (Greek: Χρήστος Δημητρίου Λαμπράκης; 24 February 1934 – 21 December 2009) was the owner of Lambrakis Press Group (DOL), one of the largest newspaper groups in Greece, and arguably the most influential.

== Biography ==
Lambrakis was born in Athens, the son of publishing tycoon Dimitrios Lambrakis. The Lambrakis family originates from Chania in Western Crete. From 1954 to 1957 he worked as a journalist at the To Vima newspaper and was editor of the weekly magazine Tachydromos. In 1957, at the age of 23, he took over the management of Lambrakis Press when his father Dimitrios died. Since 1970, when Lambrakis Press became a limited company, he has been chairman of the board. Lambrakis was one of the most powerful men in Greece, and despite his great wealth and social position, his many publications always supported progressive and left-wing causes.

He was also President of the Lambrakis Research Foundation, and of the "Friends of Music" Society, the sponsors of the Athens Concert Hall main hall.

Lambrakis underwent heart surgery on 30 November 2009 at the Onassis Cardiac Surgery Center in Athens. He died from multiple organ failure in Athens on 21 December 2009.

== Sources ==
- DOL annual report, 2004
