= Access to public information in Greece =

Access to public information and freedom of information (FOI) refer to the right of access to information held by public bodies also known as "right to know". Access to public information is considered of fundamental importance for the effective functioning of democratic systems, as it enhances governments' and public officials' accountability, boosting people participation and allowing their informed participation into public life. The fundamental premise of the right of access to public information is that the information held by governmental institutions is in principle public and may be concealed only on the basis of legitimate reasons which should be detailed in the law.

In Greece, access to information is a Constitutional right. Access to public information is governed by several laws since 1986, but according to Transparency International Greece the practical implementation of these provisions is quite poor. In addition, Law 3448/2006, on the reuse of public sector information, harmonises the national laws with the requirements on the European Union Directive 2003/98/EC. Due to the Greek government-debt crisis, a law was passed in July 2010 providing for the online publication of all decisions involving commitments of funds in the government sector.

== FOI provisions under the law ==
According to the Greek legal framework, all persons have the right to information in accordance with the law. Restrictions may be imposed only on the basis of reasons specified by law and insofar as they are absolutely necessary and justified for reasons of national security, contrast to organised crime and of protecting rights and interests of third parties.

The Greek access to information law applies to administrative documents, in particular, only to a certain kind of administrative documents, such as reports, studies, minutes, statistical data, circulars, replies of the Administration, opinions and resolutions.

The definition of the "public services" which are subject to access to information law includes all central, regional and local administration, but not the executive branch. The law does not specify if it applies also to State-owned enterprises (commercial entities that are owned or controlled by the State), to other public authorities (including constitutional, statutory and oversight body, such as election commission or information commissioner/er, or to private bodies performing a public function or receive significant public funding.

Competent authorities are obliged to handle the requests and decide on them within the time limit, if any, stipulated by the relevant special provisions, otherwise, within twenty days. Request submissions may be done electronically, in written form, in person, or by email. In case the request cannot be handled within this time limit, the competent service is obliged to notifying the following to the interested party in writing: the reason for the delay; the public officer to whom the case was assigned and his/her telephone number; the supporting documents that may be missing.

Costs for accessing information under the FOI law are limited to the actual costs for reproducing the documents. According to the Greek access to information law, the competent legislative authority may refuse to satisfy the right of access to information if the documents requested refer to the discussion of the Cabinet of Ministers of if the satisfaction of this right may substantially obstruct the investigation of judicial, police or military authorities concerning the commission of a crime or an administrative violation.

The refusal to grant access to documents under the FOI law should be justified and notified in writing to the applicant within one month after the submission of the request. In case of refusals, applicants can apply to the administrative authority that issued the deed (application for remedy) or for the cancellation thereof to the superior authority of the authority that issued the deed (hierarchical appeal). The right to lodge an external appeal with an independent oversight body (e.g. an information commission or ombudsman) is not mentioned by the law, Ombudsman in Greece has a proactive attitude in defence of the access to public document field.

The principle of transparency in all areas of public life, including media, is expected to be enhanced given that there is an Action Plan Promoting Open Government since 2014 (Greek Action Plan 2014-16). Technical and institutional changes have been adopted to enhance the principle of transparency and these should lead to the enhancement of the functionality of the DIAVGEIA project (Transparency Program Initiative), to the publication of public procurements and to the open, transparent and secure exchange of public documents. The DIAVGEIA project began on October 1, 2010. Under this Transparency Program Initiative, all government institutions are obliged to upload their acts and decisions on the Internet with special attention to issues of national security and sensitive personal data. Each document is digitally signed and assigned a unique Internet Uploading Number (IUN) certifying that the decision has been uploaded at the “Transparency Portal”. Following the latest legislative initiative (Law 4210/2013) of the Ministry of Administrative Reform and e-Governance, administrative acts and decisions are not valid unless published online.

In particular, as to the right to access public information, the innovations provided by the Action Plan promoting Open Government are the following:

- Acts that are not published in the Official Gazette, are valid and get into force only if they are published on the Transparency Portal
- The uploaded document prevails over all other versions of the act (prototypes in paper)
- Uploaded acts can be used by citizens and the other public authorities without validation, by solely referring to their unique number.

== See also ==
- Access to public information in Europe
- Freedom of information
- Freedom of information laws by country
- List of libraries in Greece
- Transparency of media ownership in Europe
- Media of Greece
- Open access in Greece to scholarly communication
- Transparency of media ownership in Greece
