= Argostoli Public Library =

Public library in Argostoli, Greece

Coordinates: 38.1768°N 20.4868°E

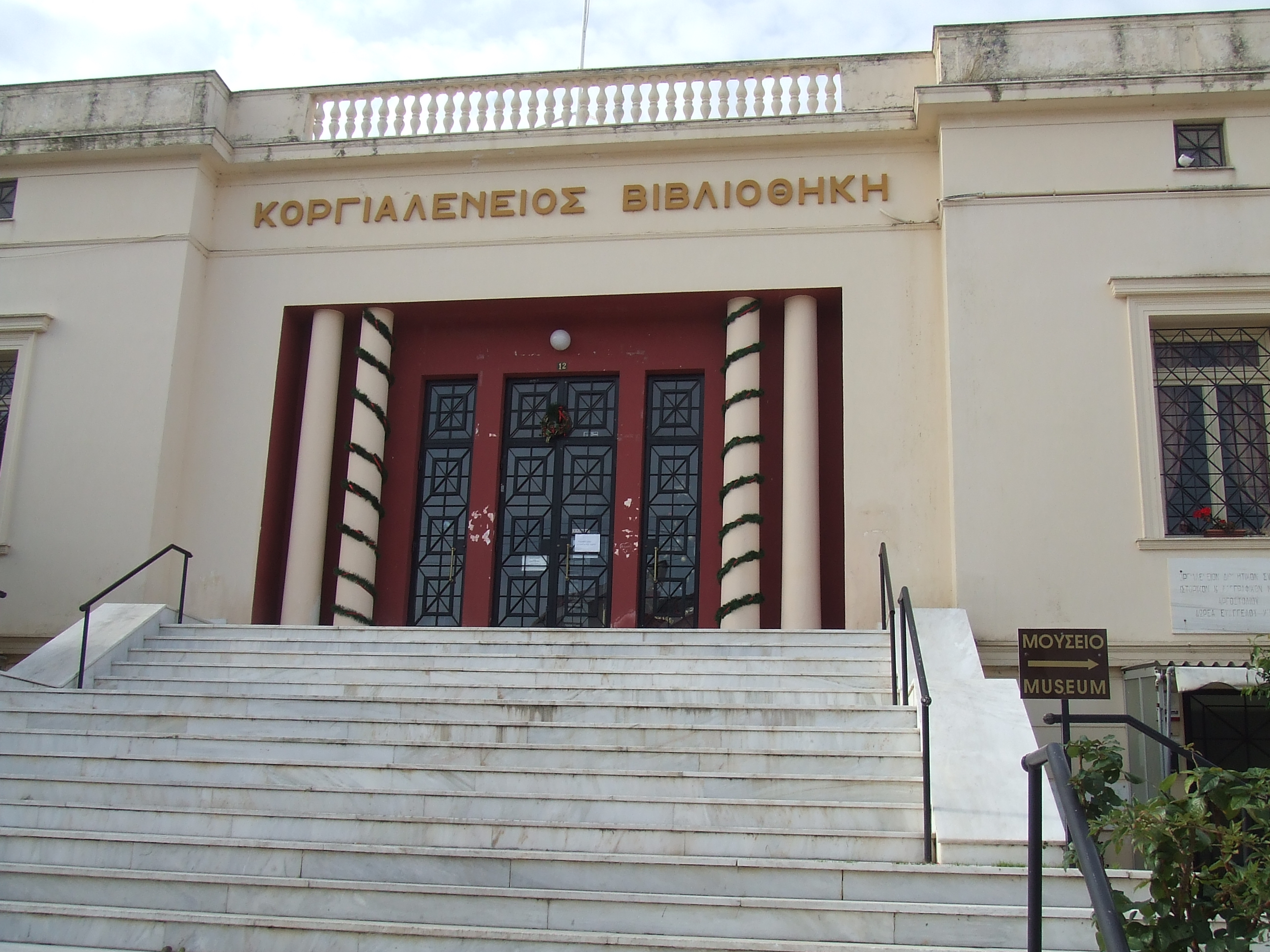
Korgialenios Public Library in Argostoli, Kefalonia

The Argostoli Public Library (Greek: Δημόσια Βιβλιοθήκη Αργοστολίου), also known as the Korgialenios Library (Κοργιαλένειος Βιβλιοθήκη), is a Greek public library in Argostoli, Kefalonia. The library shares the same building as the Korgialenio History and Folklore Museum.

== History ==
The Korgialenios Library of Argostoli was founded in 1924 as bequeathed by the will of Marinos Korgialenios, whose name the library bears. The library is supervised by the Ministry of Education, Research and Religious Affairs in the direction of offering visitors information services and access to its resources as well as encouraging research and cultural development in the local society. In conjunction with the Korgialenios Folklore Museum and the co-located archive collections of the prefecture of Kefalonia, it has been said that they comprise a "significant focal point of scientific and intellectual activity on a global scale". The library commenced operation in 1925 and in 1926 it was merged with the older Public Library, which operated in Argostoli since 1887. The 1953 Ionian earthquake totally destroyed the library building, however the books were salvaged. The Korgialenios Foundation spent a considerable amount of the remaining funds of the will to rebuild the library in its current building.

== Current operation ==
Today both the library and the museum depend on state funding, which has in the course of time disrupted their regular operation. As a result of financial problems on 15 January 2017 the Board of Directors of the Korgialenios Foundation decided to reduce the opening hours of the library to three hours daily. A month later, a member of the Board announced that the efforts of the Foundation to secure funds for the library to continue its operation have been rendered fruitless and if the situation is not remedied the library will cease to operate.

== See also ==
- List of libraries in Greece
