= 2015 Greek football match-fixing scandal =

Sports scandal in Greece

2015 Greek football scandal
- Date: 2015
- Location: Greece
- Also known as: Criminal organization controlling Greek football
- Suspects: Theodoros Kouridis, Georgios Sarris, Aristidis Stathopoulos, Ioannis Kompotis, Georgios Spanos, Giorgos Arvanitidis, Ioannis Papakonstantinou, Nikos Prountzos, Pafsanias Papanikolaou, Christos Ifantis, Giorgos Douros, Thanasis Briakos, Thanasis Giahos, Ilias Spathas, Alexandros Dimitropoulos, Apostolos Amparkiolis, Giannis Kampaksis, Kostas Ioannidis, Giannis Agkelopoulos, Giorgos Lanaris, Giorgos Vlassis, Maria Anastasaki, Lefteris Zampras, Harilaos Zigogiannis, Ioanna Pantelopoulou
- Convictions: All suspects cleared of wrongdoing, and acquitted.

The 2015 Greek football scandal was a sports scandal in Greece’s top professional association football league that involved numerous executives from different clubs and from Greek Football Association and referees. The scandal emerged in 2014 when prosecutor Aristidis Korreas' published a 173-page report. The report made allegations of collusion between clubs’ executives and the Hellenic Football Federation, and claimed that the Federation, executives, football players and referees had formed a criminal organization in order to control the Greek football through fixing matches and blackmailing.

In 2017, 28 people were charged with various offences, most of which were dropped by the Supreme Court in 2018, and finally on January 28, 2021, the three-member Criminal Court of Appeals unanimously voted to acquit all the defendants in the case.

== Investigation ==
In the summer of 2011, the Greek football was under the storm of Koriopolis scandal, a massive match-fixing case with many officials involved. In December 2014, it came to light that the prosecutor Aristidis Korreas had pressed charges against 16 individuals including officials from football teams, the Greek football federation and referees and particularly for offenses including setting up, participating in and directing a criminal organization, fraud, attempted criminal extortion and corruption that were committed between 2011 and 2013. The investigation was initiated by anonymous complaints regarding the bombing of a referee’s bakery and by news reports regarding the appointments of refereeing officials for Super League and Football League matches. The allegations were mainly based on phone calls taped by the National Intelligence Service of Greece.

In June 2015, suspects were being questioned by investigating judge Georgios Andreadis. Most of the defendants were forced to stop being involved in any football activity until the trial begins.

== UEFA's reaction and Sporting trial ==
On 30 June 2015, UEFA's General secretary Gianni Infantino stated that Olympiakos will keep their spot in the Champions League for the time, such as Asteras Tripolis. Later, the Court of Arbitration for Sport confirmed the participation of Olympiakos in the Champions League. On 17 June 2015, the English sports-site Inside World Football had revealed that UEFA's integrity officer for the HFF (Dimitris Davakis) didn't state to the UEFA's Ethics and Disciplinary Inspector, Miguel Liétard Fernandez-Palacios, the judicial process and the alleged involvement of Asteras Tripolis in the Greek match-fixing scandal of Koriopolis, regarding their participation in the UEFA Europa League.

According to the Telegraph, UEFA did not respond to a request to confirm whether Infantino's deputy, Theodore Theodoridis, had recused himself from any discussions or decisions about the handling of the Olympiakos case, because of the relationship of Theodoridis's father, Savvas, vice-president of Olympiakos, and Theodoridis Jnr. Due to the involvement of Olympiacos and Atromitos in Match fixing scandal, both clubs were threatened with relegation by the Hellenic Football Federation (EPO).

The defendants, including Marinakis, Sarris, Sa Pinto, Stathopoulos etc, were acquitted by the Ethics Committee for the category of match-fixing for football match between Olympiacos - Atromitos.

== Trial ==
In 2017 the Judicial Council decided to put 28 individuals in trial with various charges. Among the defendants were Evangelos Marinakis, Georgios Sarris, Stathopoulos, Ioannis Kompotis, Georgios Spanos, Giorgos Arvanitidis, Ilias Spathas and Ioannis Papakonstantinou.

In 2018 the Supreme Court dropped most of the charges including the allegations of fraud, blackmail, joining and running a criminal organization and bombing were dropped and sent the case back to judicial court for further examination as regarding match-fixing allegations.

In 2019 the Court of Appeals Council ruled that a total of 28 people would face trial over unlawful influence of sporting event results. On 28 January 2021, the Court of Appeals unanimously acquitted all the defendants of match-fixing. After a thorough analysis of all the elements of the investigation, from the testimony of the witnesses (and the contradictions they encountered) and from the rejection of the pre-investigation conclusion by the lawyers of the accused, the court decided to reject all the accusations.

== Accusations ==
Accused	Position	Accusations	Status
Evangelos Marinakis	Olympiacos F.C. owner and president	Involved in and directing a criminal organization; Aiding and abetting blackmailing; Aiding and abetting explosion; Aiding and abetting bribery; Fraud (all felony crimes)	Innocent for all charges.
Theodoros Kouridis	Former HFF counsel	Constituting and directing a criminal organization; Fraud; Blackmailing; Bribery (all felony crimes)	Innocent for all charges.
Georgios Sarris	Former HFF and Referee Committee president	Constituting and directing a criminal organization; Fraud; Blackmailing; Bribery (all felony crimes)	Innocent for all charges.
Aristidis Stathopoulos	HFF board of directors member	Constituting a criminal organization; Fraud; Blackmailing (all felony crimes)	Innocent for all charges.
Ioannis Kompotis	Levadiakos F.C. owner	Bribery	Innocent for all charges.
Giorgos Spanos	Atromitos F.C. owner	Bribery	Innocent for all charges.
Giorgos Arvanitidis	Former Veria F.C. owner	Bribery	Innocent for all charges.
Ioannis Papakonstantinou	HFF board of directors member	Involved in a criminal organization; Blackmailing	Innocent for all charges.
Nikos Prountzos	HFF board of directors member	Blackmailing	Innocent for all charges.
Pafsanias Papanikolaou	HFF executive	Bribery	Innocent for all charges.
Hristos Ifantis	HFF substitute general manager	Bribery	Innocent for all charges.
Giorgos Douros	Former Referee Committee substitute president	Involved in a criminal organization; Fraud; Blackmailing; Bribery	Innocent for all charges.
Thanasis Briakos	Former Referee Committee member	Involved in a criminal organization; Fraud; Blackmailing; Bribery	Innocent for all charges.
Thanasis Giahos	Referee	Bribery	Innocent for all charges.
Ilias Spathas	Referee	Bribery	Innocent for all charges.
Alexandros Dimitropoulos	Referee	Bribery	Innocent for all charges.
Apostolos Amparkiolis	Referee	Bribery	Innocent for all charges.
Giannis Kampaksis	Referee	Bribery	Innocent for all charges.
Kostas Ioannidis	Referee	Bribery	Innocent for all charges.
Giannis Angelopoulos	Atromitos F.C. Director of Football	Bribery	Innocent for all charges.
Giorgos Lanaris	Veria F.C. Director of Football	Bribery	Innocent for all charges.
Giorgos Vlassis	HFF Referee Court member	Bribery	Innocent for all charges.
Maria Anastasaki	HFF Appeal Court member	Bribery	Innocent for all charges.
Lefteris Zampras	Former Football League Disciplinary Committee president	Bribery	Innocent for all charges.
Harilaos Zigogiannis	Former Football League Disciplinary Committee member	Bribery	Innocent for all charges.
Ioanna Pantelopoulou	Football League Disciplinary Committee member	Bribery	Innocent for all charges.

== See also ==
- Koriopolis
- 2015 FIFA corruption case
