= Hafiz Ahmed Agha Library =

Coordinates: 36.4437°N 28.2239°E

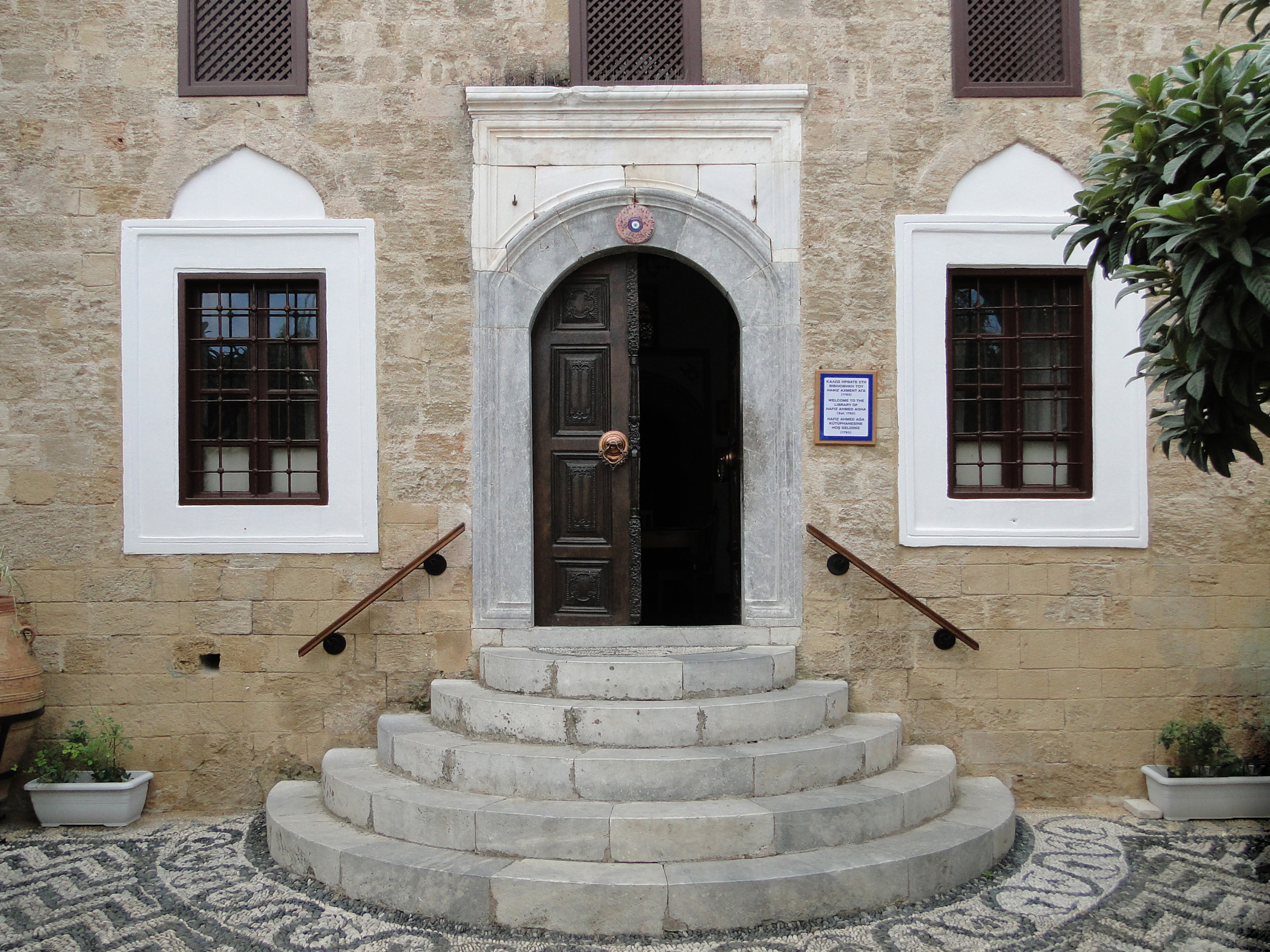
Hafiz Ahmed Agha Library entrance

Hafiz Ahmed Agha Library is an important historic Ottoman building in the medieval city of Rhodes in Greece, a UNESCO World Heritage Site. The library was founded by Hafiz Ahmed Agha in 1793.

== History ==
Hafiz Ahmed Agha was born in the village of Asgourou (Turkish: Uzgur Köyü), 3 km to the south from the present center of the city of Rhodes, in the middle of the 18th century in a wealthy, established Ottoman family. He was educated in the imperial court and later became the chief equerry of the sultan. He retired in 1789 but was reactivated and became a member of the regular delegations travelling to Mecca with the yearly presents of the sultan to the Sharif of Mecca. He died on such a travel sometime between 1800 and 1802.

He founded this library for the literate public of his hometown with 1995 manuscripts from the entire scope of Islamic science in 1793. The institution became a center of learning. Hafiz Ahmed Agha paid the librarians also for teaching the Arabic language, which was necessary for the reading of the texts.

Presently there are 1256 manuscripts in the possession of the library. Among the most valuables there is a Koran from 1540, the history of the Turkish siege of the city in 1522, and manuscripts with Persian miniatures. On the walls of there are old maps and engravings of the town.

== Gallery ==
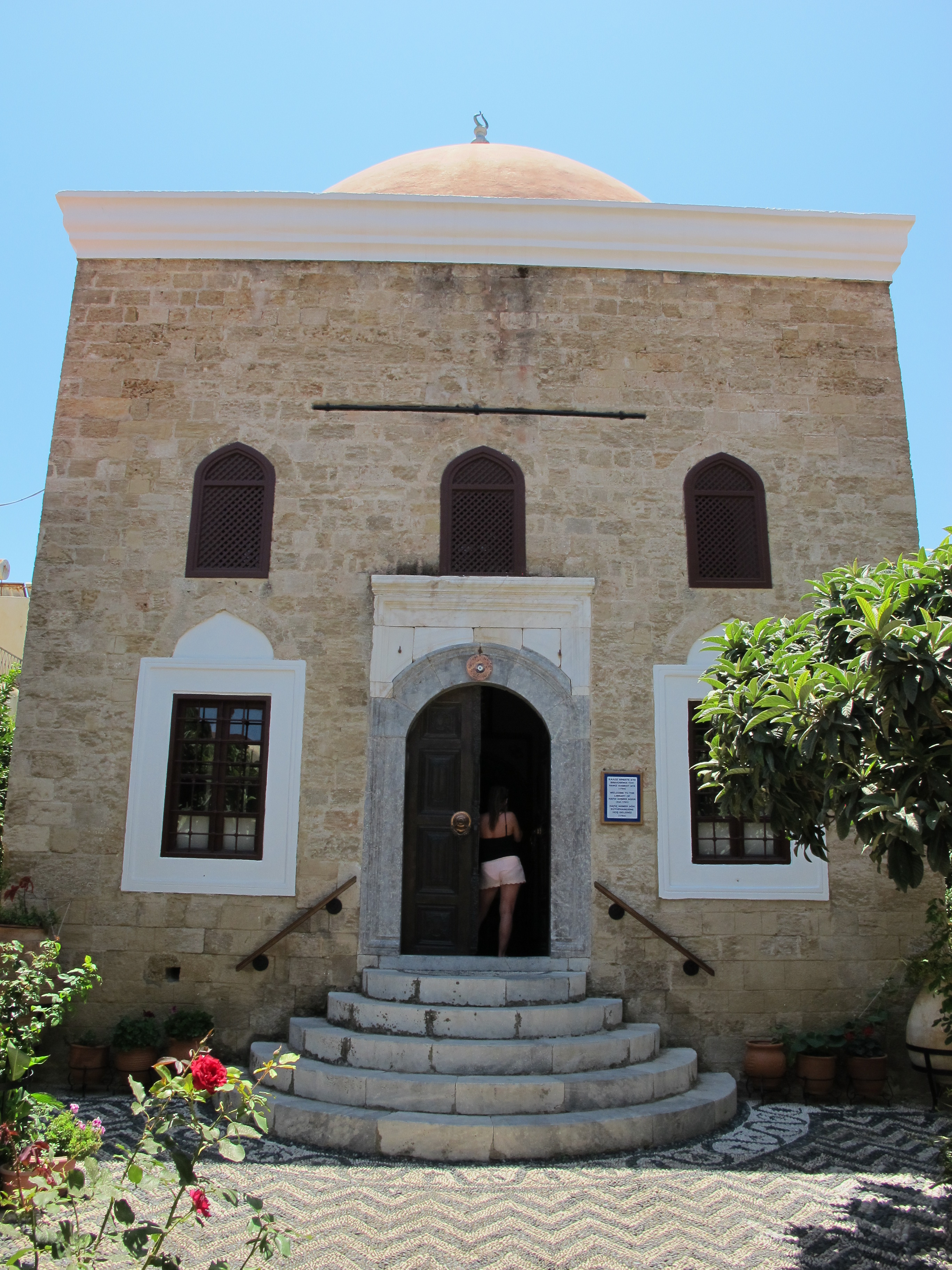
The building

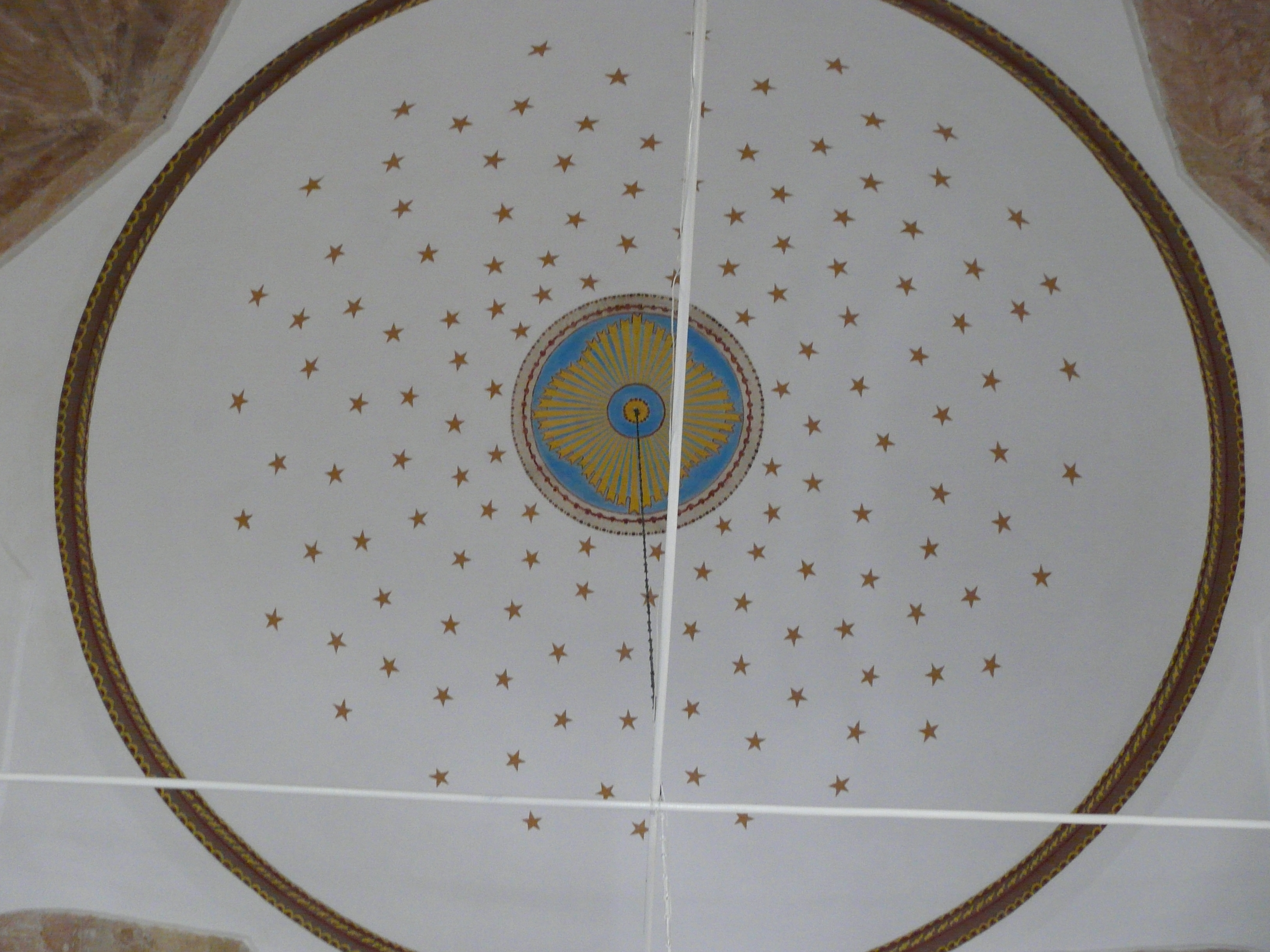
Ceiling

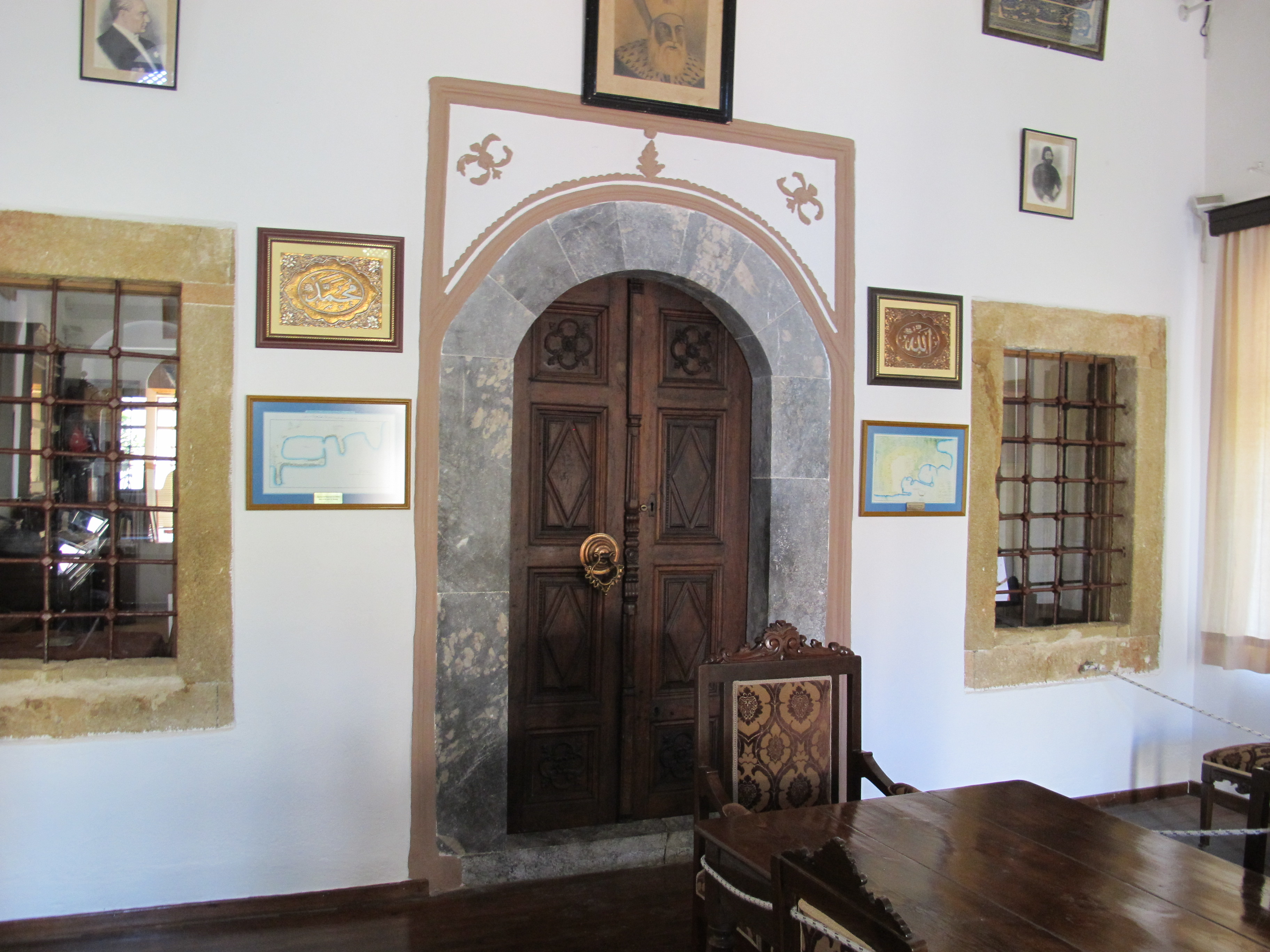
View from the interior

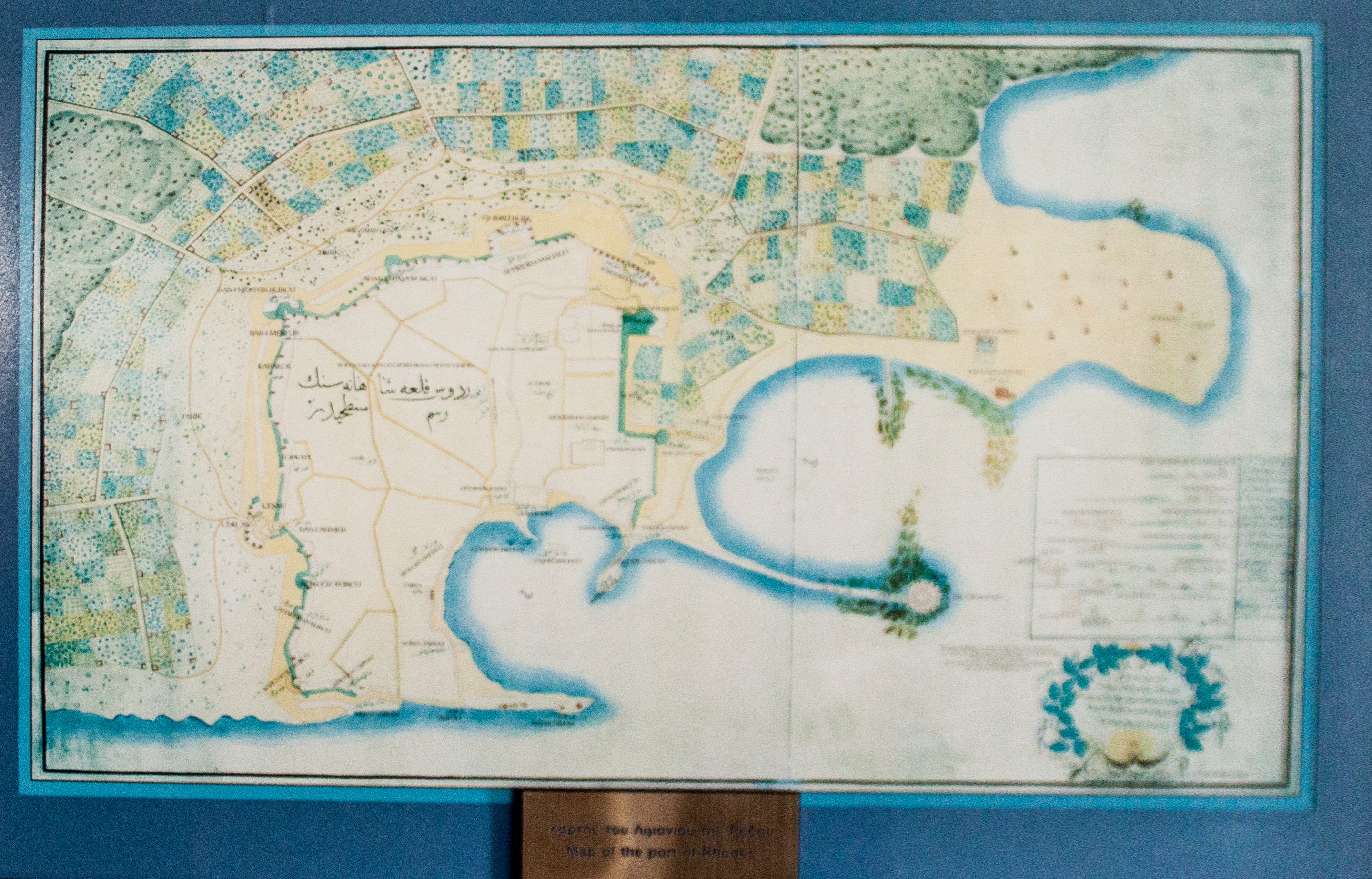
Old map of the port of Rhodes from the collection of the library

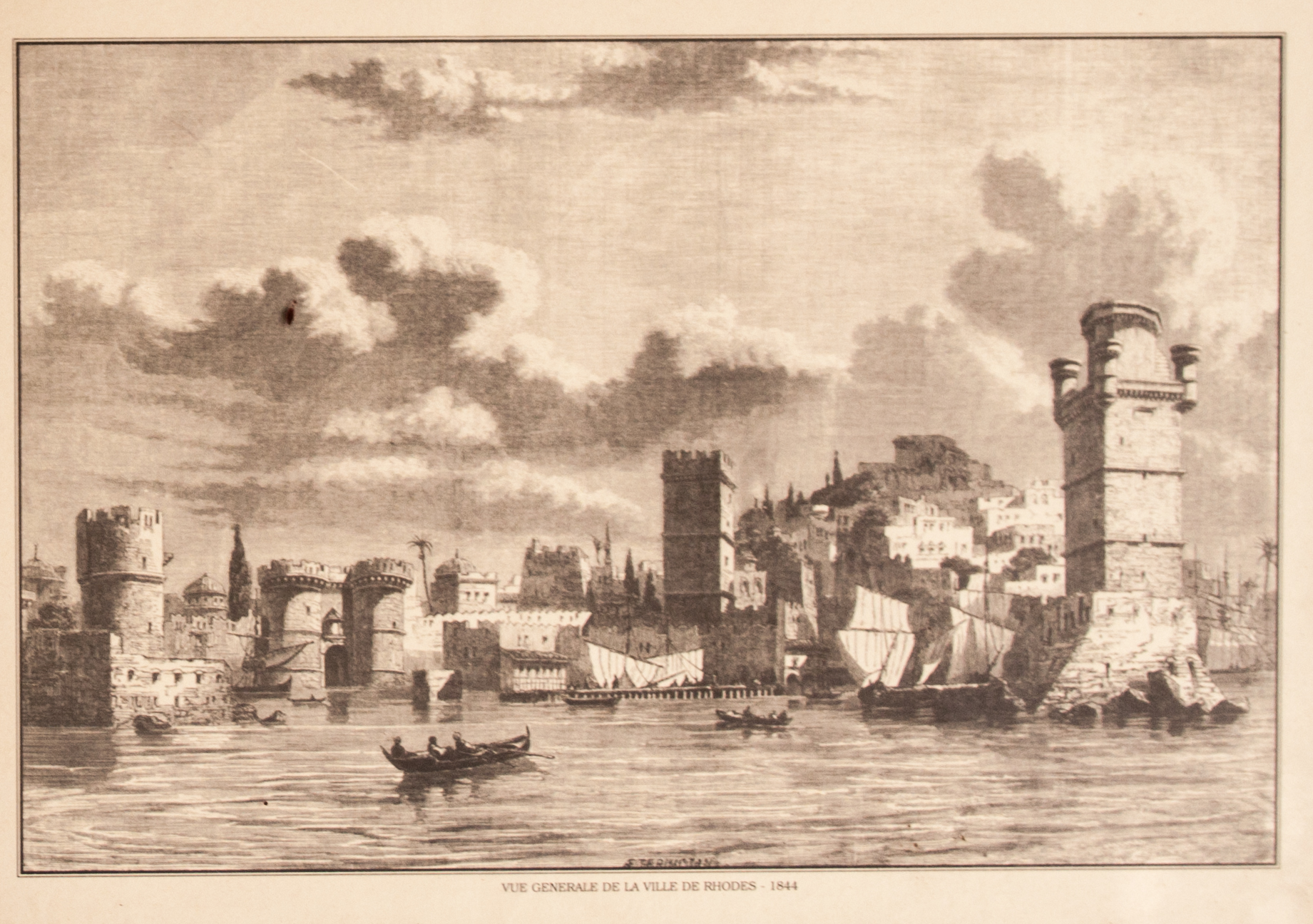
General view of the town of Rhodes, 1844

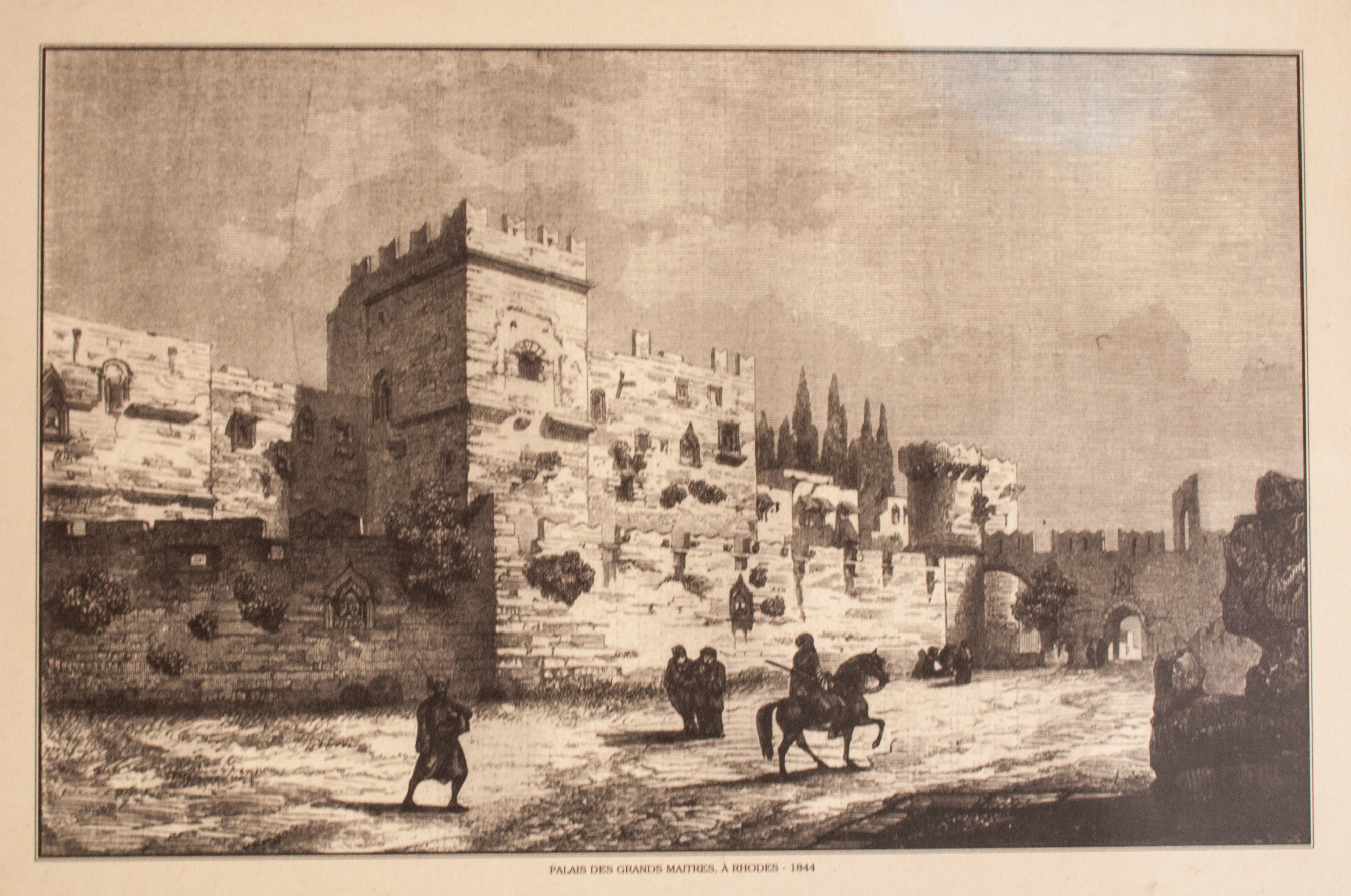
Grand Master's Palace, 1844

== See also ==
- List of libraries in Greece

== Sources ==
- Davies, Paul Harcourt. Rhodes.
- Mavromataki, Maria (ed.). Rhodes. Athens: Haitalis.
- Information tables in the Hafiz Ahmed Agha Library, Rhodes
