= Ta Nea =

Daily newspaper in Greece

- Type: Daily newspaper
- Format: Compact
- Owner: Alter Ego Media S.A.
- Founder: Dimitrios Lambrakis
- Managing editor: Giorgos Mantelas
- Founded: 28 May 1931; 94 years ago
- Political alignment: Centrism; Liberal conservatism Formerly; Centre-left; Pro-Europeanism
- Language: Greek
- City: Athens
- Country: Greece
- Circulation: 35,000
- Website: www.tanea.gr

Ta Nea (Greek: Τα Νέα 'The News') is a daily newspaper published in Athens. It was owned by Lambrakis Press Group (DOL), which also published the newspaper To Vima. The assets of DOL were acquired in 2017 by Alter Ego Media S.A.

The newspaper began publishing in 1931 under the title Αθηναϊκά Νέα (Athinaika Nea, Athens News), with the first issue being released on May 28. After the Axis occupation of Greece, it changed its name simply to "Ta Nea".

Ta Nea has been Greek's best-selling newspaper for decades, although the internet and the 2008 financial crisis have affected its circulation. The circulation peaked at around 200,000 copies in the 1990s, but by 2008, circulation had declined by more than half of its peak. It is a traditional center-left friendly newspaper, in the 1980s and 1990s strongly supporting the Panhellenic Socialist Movement (PASOK). Since 2017, it has adopted more centrist and right-wing views. Some of its prominent columnists include Aimilios Liatsos, Yannis Pretenderis, Pavlos Tsimas, Erifili Maroniti and Stavros Theodorakis.

Ta Nea is also the name of a related Greek Australian newspaper produced in Melbourne by Greek Media Group.

== See also ==
- List of newspapers in Greece
