= Koriopolis =

Match fixing scandal in Greek football

Koriopolis (Greek: Κοριόπολις) is the name given by the Greek press to a match fixing scandal in Greek football that came to light in June 2011. With the help of UEFA and the Greek National Intelligence Service, the judicial authorities initially identified 83 suspects, which subsequently increased to 187, including football officials, referees, players and police officers, who were banned from leaving the country.

The investigation centres on offences that include illegal gambling, fraud, extortion and money laundering.

The name Koriopolis is a pun on the name of the Italian scandal of Calciopoli in 2006, and the Greek word korios (phone tap).

== History ==
The investigation was launched after UEFA, the sports governing body in Europe, published a report that indicated at least 40 matches were fixed in the country during the 2009–10 season. Among the 68 suspects listed by judicial authorities on 24 June 2011 were Super League Greece chairman and Olympiacos owner, Evangelos Marinakis (who was later acquitted) other club officials, players, referees and a chief of police. Details of the scandal were outlined in a 130-page document, a copy of which was seen by the Associated Press. It contains numerous transcripts of recorded telephone conversations, filled with profanities and threats of physical violence, allegedly between corrupt team officials deciding match results, using players and referees.

Among the 68 suspects were also Thomas Mitropoulos president of (Egaleo), Ioannis Kompotis (owner of Levadiakos), Giorgos Borovilos (president of Asteras Tripolis), Dimitris Bakos (owner of Asteras Tripolis), the referees Giachos, Tryfonas, Giannis Alafouzos and many more.

Giorgos Nikitiadis, the government's deputy culture minister, described the investigation as "the darkest page in the history of Greek football" and the probe would go "as deep and as high as necessary".

== Club punishments by HFF ==
On 28 July 2011 it was announced that Olympiacos Volos and Kavala would be relegated to the Football League, and their chairmen Achilleas Beos and Chrarilaos Psomiadis would face a lifelong ban from any football-related activity. Both of them appealed the decision.

On 10 August 2011 the final decision from the HFF's court had been made. It was ultimately decided that both teams would remain in the Super League, though with points deducted from the 2011-12 Super League season; Olympiacos Volos had 10 points deducted and Kavala 8 points.

The next day, 11 August 2011, Olympiacos Volos, which had reached the Europa League play-off round, were excluded from the competition by UEFA for their involvement in the scandal. At the time, UEFA officials said no action was being considered against Olympiacos F.C. regarding its participation in the Champions League of the following season.

On 23 August 2011, Olympiacos Volos and Kavala ultimately didn't get the license to participate and were relegated to Delta Ethniki for their involvement in the scandal.

In February 2012, the Super League Greece with the agreement of the Hellenic Football Federation achieved the replacement of the two football prosecutors (Fakos, Antonakakis) with two others (Petropoulos, Karras). The scandal investigation has stopped and never resumed ever since. In September 2012, the Hellenic Football Federation decided the return Olympiacos Volos to the second division.

== Judicial process ==
In 2013, the first trial took place, which found guilty officials Chrarilaos Psomiadis and Thomas Mitropoulos.

On 18 March 2016, the president of Panathinaikos, Giannis Alafouzos sued judges Tziblakis and Poulios for the Koriopolis case. In the end, only Giorgos Tsakogiannis was convicted of illegal betting on a continuous basis and for participation in an illegal bet.

== See also ==
- 2015 Greek football scandal
- Golden Whistle: Portuguese football corruption scandal
- Calciopoli
- Brazilian football match-fixing scandal
- 2005 Bundesliga scandal
- 2011 Turkish sports corruption scandal
