= Gerasimos Lychnos =

Greek politician

- Born: 1894; Corfu, Greece
- Died: October 16, 1976 (aged 81–82); Greece

Gerasimos Lychnos (Greek: Γεράσιμος Λύχνος; 1894 – 16 October 1976) was a Greek journalist, writer and politician.

== Early life ==
Gerasimos Lychnos was born on the island of Corfu in 1894. He studied political science at Panteion University. He worked as an editor and columnist for the newspapers Skrip, Nea Imara, Nea Hellas, Patris and Ethnos, and was also the editor-in-chief of Eleftheros Typos. Between 1922 and 1928, he was editor-in-chief of To Vima. From 1929 to 1931, he published the weekly political and economic review Pitharchia.

== Political career ==
In the 1936 elections, he was elected as an MP with the Liberal Party, representing Corfu. In 1946, he served as Deputy Minister to the Prime Minister in the government of Themistoklis Sofoulis. He was re-elected in the 1950 and 1951 elections. In 1952, he joined Greek Rally and was elected on their ticket in elections that year. He served as Deputy Minister of the Presidency in the Alexandros Papagos government from 15 December 1954 to 6 October 1955.

In 1956, he joined the newly formed National Radical Union and was elected in the 1956, 1958, 1961, 1963 and 1964 elections. Between 1951 and 1964, he was also a member of the Greek parliamentary delegation to the Council of Europe.

He died on 16 October 1976. A street in Corfu Town is named after him.
