= National Map Library =

Coordinates: 40.6431°N 22.9494°E

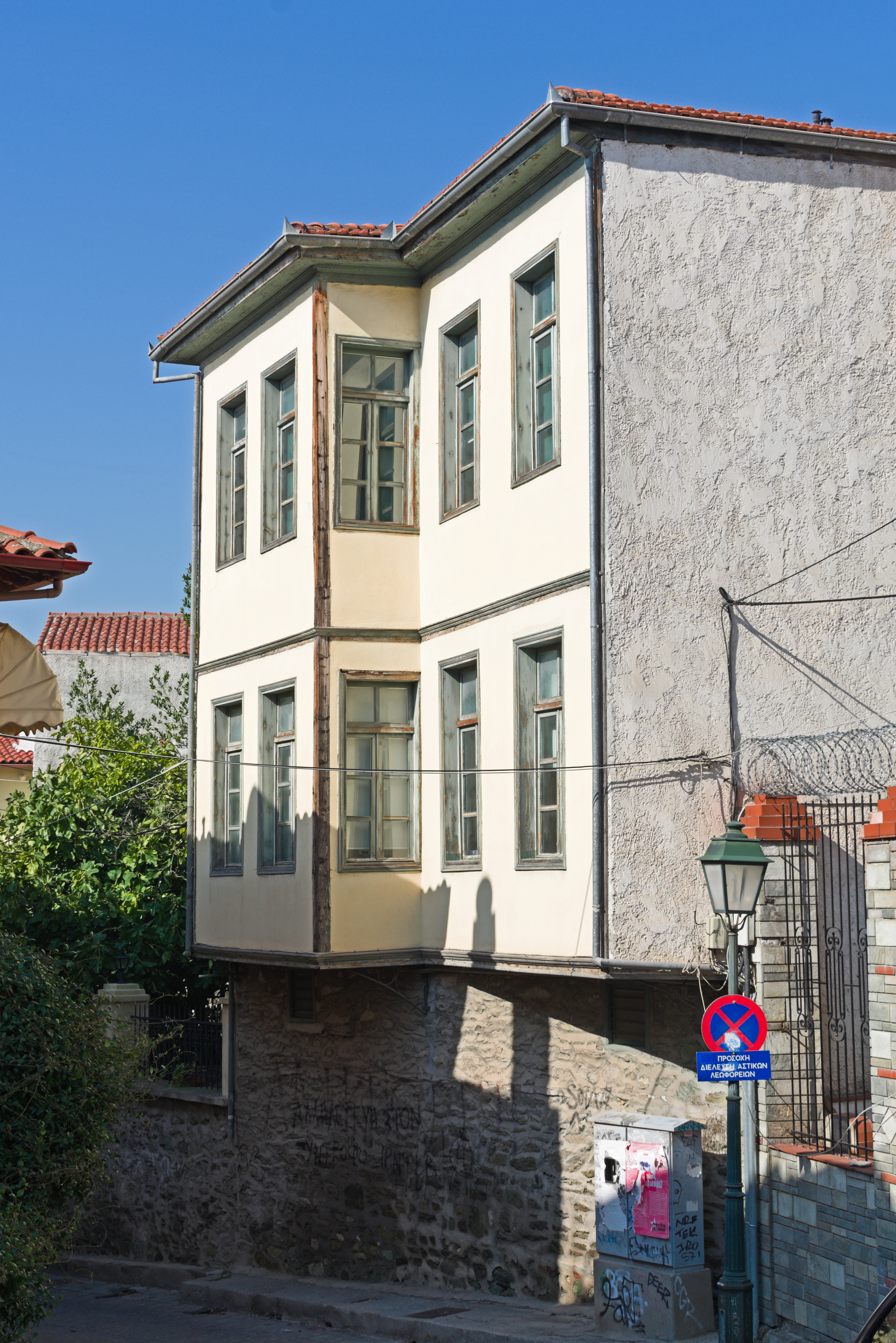
View from outside

The National Map Library (Greek: Εθνική Χαρτοθήκη), properly the National Centre for Maps and Cartographic Heritage - National Map Library, is located in Thessaloniki, Central Macedonia, Greece. It was established in 1997 (Law 2466/1997) for the purpose of preserving, archiving, conserving, promoting, and displaying maps, studying the educational, cultural, and social role of maps, collaborating at a scientific and technical level with national and international organizations, organizing permanent and mobile exhibitions accompanied by catalogues, utilising public and private map collections, and organising seminars and conferences.

Since February 1999, the National Map Library has been housed in a two-storey listed building in the Upper Town (Ano Poli). On the ground floor are the scientific and administrative departments and on the first floor there is a permanent exhibition space which hosts frequent cartographic exhibitions. There is an archive of 1,000 maps, which are being electronically documented and archived with the help of a special database.

Between 1 and 12 November 1999, there was an exhibition of six 19th-century cartoon maps of Europe, five children's maps which had been entered for the international cartographic competition in 1999, and some rare maps drawn by Sotiris Zissis, a self-taught Thessalonian cartographer.

Other exhibitions organised by the National Map Library include History in Maps at the Residency, Maps of Ports of Greek Cities of the Twentieth Century in the National Research Institute, and Greek Cartography in Thessaloniki in the Twentieth Century.

An educational programme titled The National Map Library Meets Teachers and Children has been drawn up and is addressed to schools in Macedonia and Thrace.

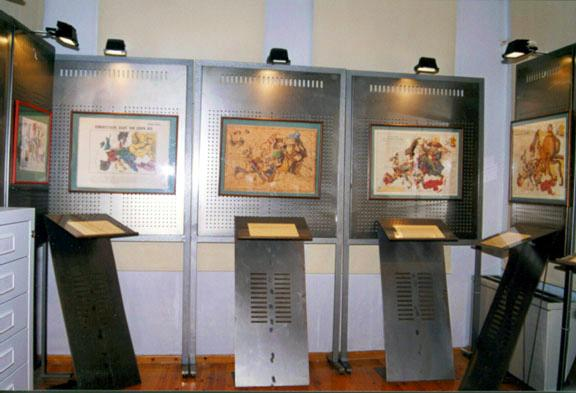
Various maps of Europe

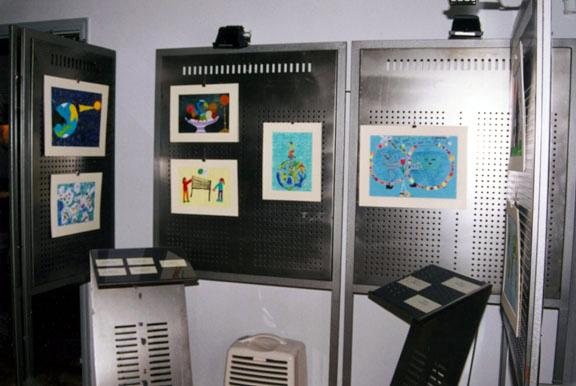
Children's maps

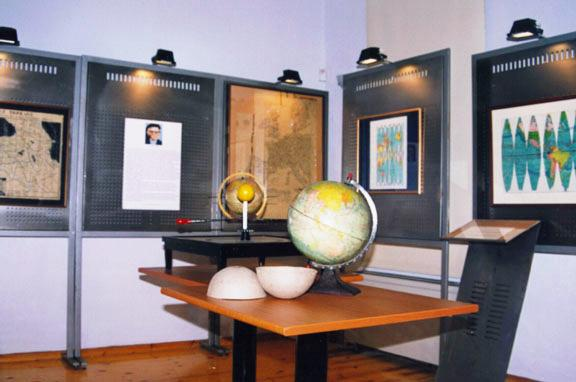
Rare maps by self-taught Thessalonian cartographer.

== See also ==
- List of libraries in Greece

== Sources ==
- The original version of this article was taken from the corresponding article at the Museums of Macedonia website, commissioned by the Macedonian Heritage foundation, written by Vlasis Vlasidis, and published under a CC-BY-SA-3.0 license.
