= To Vima =

Greek daily newspaper

- Type: daily newspaper
- Publisher: Alter Ego Media
- Founded: 1922
- Language: Greek
- City: Athens
- Country: Greece
- Website: www.tovima.gr

To Vima (Greek: Το Βήμα, lit. 'The Tribune') is a Greek weekly newspaper first published in 6 February 1922 as Elefthero Vima (Free Tribune). Its founders were the politicians and diplomats Alexandros Karapanos, Georgios Roussos, Alexandros Diomidis, Emmanouil Tsouderos, Georgios Exidaris, Konstantinos Rentis and Dimitrios Lambrakis, who also took over its management, with Gerasimos Lychnos as editor-in-chief.

It was owned by Lambrakis Press Group (DOL), a group that also publishes the newspaper Ta Nea, among others in its fold of publications. The assets of DOL were acquired in 2017 by Alter Ego Media S.A.

Its International Edition, found at tovima.com, serves as the English-language counterpart, delivering global and Greek news, analysis, and opinion pieces to an international audience.

== Circulation ==
To Vima had a circulation of 114,035 in October 2014.
