= Lambrakis Press Group =

Greek media company

Lambrakis Press Group S.A.
- Company type: Media
- Industry: Mass media Travel Industry
- Founded: 1922
- Founder: Christos Lambrakis
- Defunct: 2019
- Headquarters: Athens, Greece
- Products: Newspapers and Websites
- Owner: Stavros Psycharis, Christos Lambrakis
- Website: http://www.dol.gr

The Lambrakis Press Group S.A. (Greek: Δημοσιογραφικός Οργανισμός Λαμπράκη, ΔΟΛ) was a Greek media company.

Since 1957, it was controlled by Christos Lambrakis and played a dominant role in Greek publishing and Greek politics, especially through its flagship newspapers, To Vima and Ta Nea. The group also owned the news portal In.gr, the radio station Vima Fm 99.5 and the magazines MarieClaire, Cosmopolitan and Vita.

In July 2017, a Greek first-instance court confirmed that the B' group of assets of Lambrakis Press Group would be acquired by Alter Ego Mass Media S.A., a company including the media assets of Greek businessman Evangelos Marinakis. The court's judgement for the transfer of the ownership of B' group of assets of DOL to Alter Ego followed the latter's success as the highest bidder in an auction process held earlier in 2017.

However, on 11 July 2019, the Athens first-instance court declared DOL to be in a state of bankruptcy.

== Management ==
The company and the Group were managed by a board of directors, with Evangelos Marinakis serving as President of the Board.
