= Lilian Voudouri Music Library of Greece =

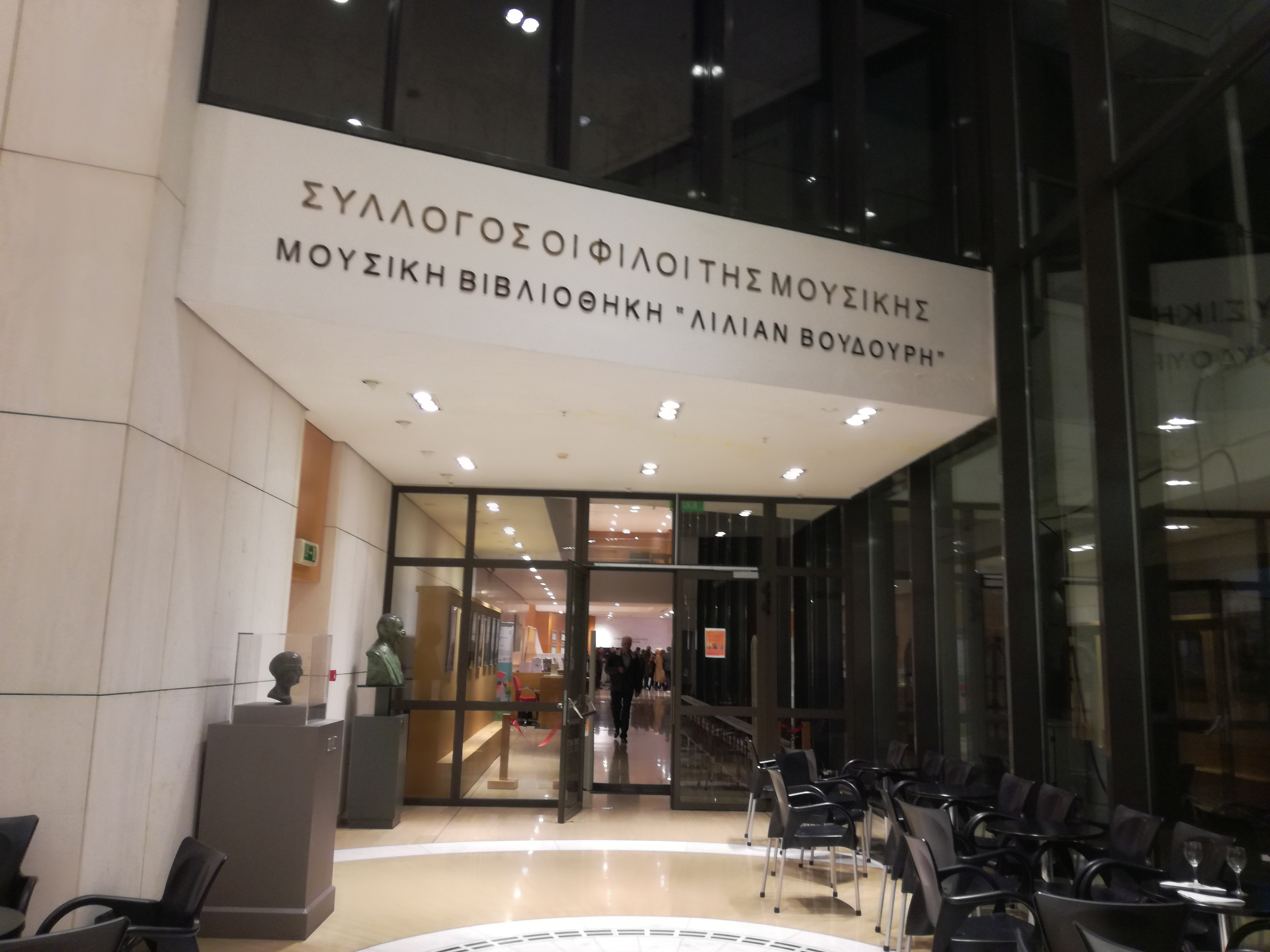
- 37.9811°N 23.7540°E
- Location: Athens
- Established: 1997; 29 years ago

Other information
- Website: mmb.org.gr

The Lilian Voudouri Music Library of Greece is a library located in Greece that specializes in music and was created under an initiative of the Friends of Music Society. The library opened to the public in February 1997. The library’s collection is primarily made up of western European music, going back to ancient Greek music. The collection also includes material on world music, jazz, ancient Greek art, theater, dance, literature, philosophy, and fine art. The library's collection includes books, audio recordings, musical scores, microforms, journals, concert programs, CD-ROMs, and databases.

The Library's first Director was musicologist Dr. Christoph Stroux. From 2005 to 2024, the Library's Director was musicologist Mrs. Stephanie Merakos.

== See also ==
- List of libraries in Greece
