= Central Public Library of Serres =

Public library in Greece

Coordinates: 41°05′16″N 23°33′03″E

Central Public Library of Serres is a public library located in Serres, Macedonia, Greece. It was founded in 1952. It is administered by the Ministry of Education, Religion, Culture and Sports. The core of its collection has been provided by the Ministry of education, the National Library, the French Embassy, the Ministry of external affairs and with donations from the friends of the library. In our days, the enrichment of the collection is mainly made through orders.

Since 2006, the Central Public Library of Serres is hosted in its new 5 store building of 3.200 square meters, which provides reading rooms, book storage facilities, a children's library, a conference and meeting room, a multimedia room and other creativity spaces.

The collection of the Central Library includes 83.000 volumes and its members have reached the 26.000. All books have been processed electronically with the ABEKT 5.6 integrated library system of the National Documentation Centre. There is also a collection of digitised books and historical material that can by accessed through an online database.

The Central Public Library of Serres also has a mobile library, to serve citizens from the prefecture of Serres.

== See also ==
- List of libraries in Greece
