= Miltiadis Marinakis =

Greek shipowner and politician

- Μιλτιάδης Μαρινάκης

Member of the Hellenic Parliament
- In office 5 November 1989 – 12 March 1990
- In office 20 December 1986 – 2 June 1989

Personal details
- Born: 15 September 1930 Crete, Greece
- Died: 27 April 1999 (aged 68) Athens, Greece
- Party: New Democracy
- Spouse: Eirini Karakatsani
- Children: Evangelos Marinakis
- Occupation: shipowner, politician

Miltiadis Marinakis (15 September 1930 – 27 Αpril 1999) was a Greek shipowner and politician.

== Biography ==
Miltiadis Marinakis was born in Heraklion on the Greek island of Crete and was the son of local businessman Apostolos Marinakis. He grew up in a wealthy family, who owned one of the best-known foundries on the island, which made bells for Cretan churches. Today the bells still decorate the church of St. Minas in Heraklion and other churches in Sitia, Rethymno and Chania. Due to its renown, the company had exports to Italy, France, and the Dalmatian Coast (mainly Trieste). During the German occupation of WWII the family fortune was confiscated. Miltiadis Marinakis became part of the EAM and EPON resistance movement.

After the war he studied in the Commercial Navy School and worked for some time at his brother's machining center. In the beginning of the 1960s he settled in Piraeus and worked in ship repairs. In 1970 he founded the company "Vanimar" and bought his first ship. He was always active in shipping, increasing his fleet. Miltiadis Marinakis later became involved in politics. He was elected local councilor (1978 and 1982) for Piraeus. He was elected a member of the Greek Parliament with the New Democracy party in 1985 and in 1989.

Marinakis was also involved in sports. In his youth he played football with his brother for the Ergotelis football team in Crete. Later on he became a shareholder of Olympiacos F.C.He was curator at the polo team division and in 1979, together with ten other shipowners, he became part of the Olympiacos management, as he was general commander of the football department. Subsequently, he was the only one, together with Loucas Hajioannou, who did not sell his share to George Koskotas. He was a talent scout for the team, as he discovered Nikos Vamvakoulas and presented him to the team as a gift, while he selected Nikos Sarganis as the team's first goalkeeper.

He was married to Eirini Marinaki (née Karakatsani) and had a son, Evangelos Marinakis.
