= Library of Pantainos =

Building in ancient Athens

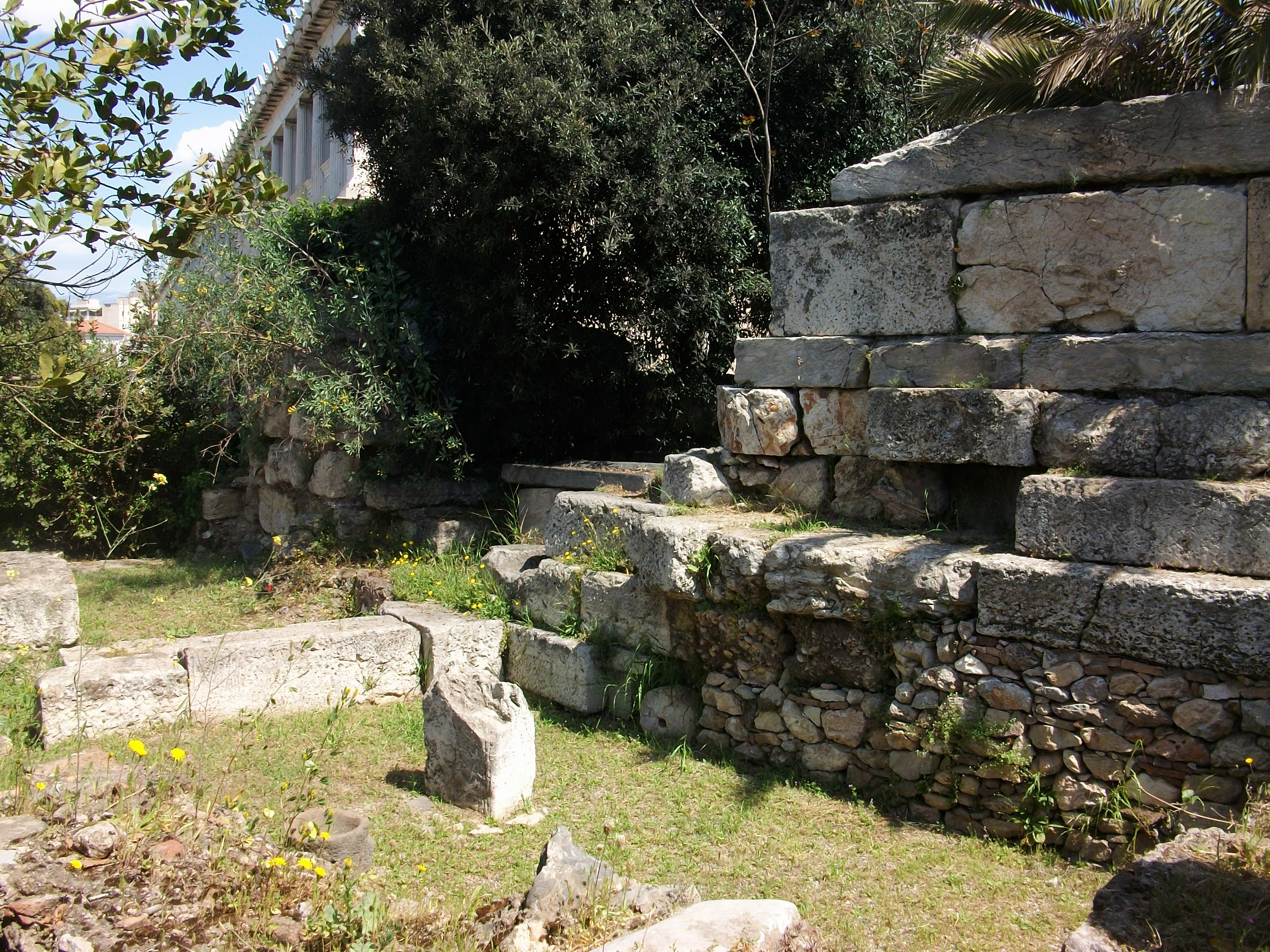

- Location within Athens
- 37°58′32″N 23°43′34″E
- Type: Library
- Periods: Classical era
- Cultures: Ancient Greece, Ancient Rome
- Location: Greece
- Region: Athens

History
- Built: 98 AD

Site notes
- Material: Marble
- Owner: Public property
- Management: Minister for Culture
- Public access: Monastiraki station

The Library of Pantainos was a building in ancient Athens. It was located at the southeast end of the Agora of Athens, south of the Stoa of Attalus, on the left side of the Panathenaic Way. It was built by the Athenian philosopher Titus Flavius Pantainos between 98 and 102 AD, during the reign of the Roman emperor Trajan. The library building was dedicated to Athena Archegetis, with Trajan himself and the people of Athens, according to an inscription on the lintel of the main entrance, which is preserved embedded in the late Roman wall,.

The monument still survives today but is in a fragmentary state. It is partially covered by the late Roman wall of the Agora and mainly by a large tower. It is one of the buildings where the study of philosophy and the cult of the Muses flourished. Destroyed in 267 A.D. during the Herulian incursion, it was incorporated in the 5th century into the great peristyle.

== Architecture ==
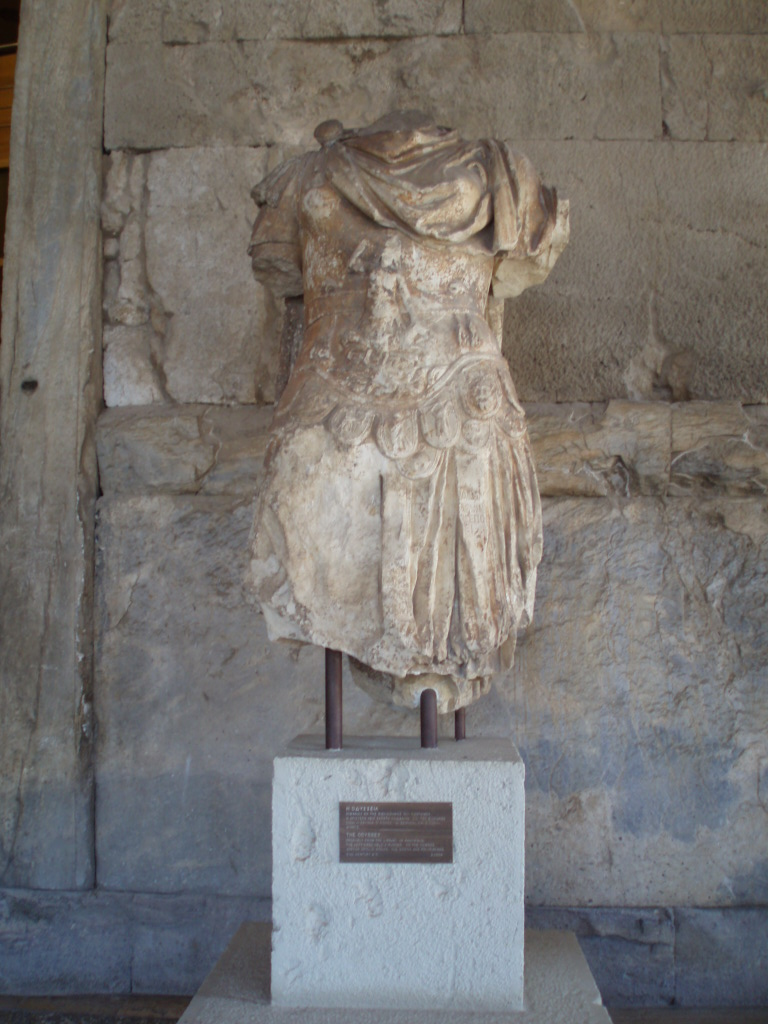
Statue of a woman, impersonating the Odyssey. Library of Pantainos

The building had an unusual floor plan and structure, and is unlike any other known Roman library. The reason for the unusual floor plan was due to the irregular level of the area.

The core of the building consisted of two spaces. One was a large open courtyard measuring 20 × 13.5 m, the floor of which was paved with small irregular marble tiles embedded in mortar. The other space was a large square room, open to the east, whose floor was paved with marble slabs. Later, a peristyle was added to the courtyard, the central part of which was also paved with marble slabs. The entrance to the building was in the area directly below the site where the inscribed lintel was found. No trace remains of the internal supports of the shelves where the books would have been stored. The walls were internally lined with marble slabs, as was the floor.

The architrave on the north and west facades had Ionic columns with blue marble flutes. The masonry was not particularly elaborate as rubble stone walls were used.

== The excavations ==
Excavations of the building began in 1933 and the first results appeared two years later, in 1935. The eastern part of the library building was completed in 1970.

== Inscriptions ==
There are two inscriptions, one referring to the foundation of the library by T. Flavius Pantainos and the other to its operation.

ΑΘΗΝΑ ΠΟΛΙΑΔΙ ΚΑΙ ΑΥΤΟΚΡΑΤΟΡΙ ΚΑΙΣΑΡΙ ΣΕΒΑ{Σ}ΣΤΩ ΝΕΡΒΑ ΤΡΑΪΑΝΩ ΓΕΡΜΑΝΙΚΩ ΚΑΙ ΤΗ ΠΟΛΙ ΤΗ ǀ ΑΘΗΝΑΙΩΝ Ο ΙΕΡΕΥΣ ΜΟΥΣΩΝ ΦΙΛΟΣΟΦΩΝ Τ. ΦΛΑΒΙΟΣ ΠΑΝΤΑΙΝΟΣ ΦΛΑΒΙΟΥ ΜΕΝΑΝΔΡΟΥ ΔΙΑΔΟΧΟΥ ǀ ΥΙΟΣ ΤΑΣ ΕΞΩ ΣΤΟΑΣ ΤΟ ΠΕΡΙΣΤΥΛΟΝ ΤΗΝ ΒΥΒΛΙΟΘΗΚΗΝ ΜΕΤΑ ΤΩΝ ΒΥΒΛΙΩΝ ΤΟΝ ΕΝ ΑΥΤΟΙΣ ΠΑΝΤΑ ǀ ΚΟΣΜΟΝ ΕΚ ΤΩΝ ΙΔΙΩΝ ΜΕΤΑ ΤΩΝ ΤΕΚΝΩΝ ΦΛΑΒΙΟΥ ΜΕΝΑΝΔΡΟΥ ΚΑΙ ΦΛΑΒΙΑΣ ΣΕΚΟΥΝΔΙΛΛΗΣ ΑΝΕΘΗΚΕ

Transcription
« Ἀθηνᾷ Πολιάδι καὶ Αὐτοκράτορι Καίσαρι Σεβα{σ}στῷ Νέρβᾳ Τραϊανῷ Γερμανικῷ καὶ τῇ πόλι τῇ ǀ Ἀθηναίων ὁ ἱερεὺς Μουσῶν φιλοσόφων Τ. Φλάβιος Πάνταινος Φλαβίου Μενάνδρου διαδόχου ǀ υἱὸς τὰς ἔξω στοάς, τὸ περίστυλον, τὴν βυβλιοθήκην μετὰ τῶν βυβλίων, τὸν ἐν αὐτοῖς πάντα ǀ κόσμον, ἐκ τῶν ἰδίων μετὰ τῶν τέκνων Φλαβίου Μενάνδρου καὶ Φλαβίας Σεκουνδίλλης ἀνέθηκε »

Translation
To Athena Polias and to the Emperor Caesar Augustus Nerva Traianus Germanicus as well as to the city of Athens, the priest of the Muses of philosophers, T. Flavius Pantainos, son of the Flavius Menander the Successor, dedicated at his own expense the outer galleries, the peristyle, the library with the books and all the ornaments contained therein, with his children Flavius Menander and Flavia Secundilla.

White marble plaque - Found in the ancient Agora of Athens. The inscription recalls the rules of today's libraries. It is kept in the museum of the Stoa of Attalus.

ΒΥΒΛΙΟΝ ΟΥΚ ΕΞΕ ΝΕΧΘΗΣΕΤΑΙ ΕΠΕΙ ΩΜΟΣΑΜΕΝ. ΑΝΥΓΗ ΣΕΤΑΙ ΑΠΟ ΩΡΑΣ ΠΡΩ ΤΗΣ ΜΕΧΡΙ ΕΚΤΗΣ

Transcription
«Βυβλίον οὐκ ἐξενεχθήσεται, ἐπεὶ ὠμόσαμεν· ἀνυγήσεται ἀπὸ ὥρας πρώτης μέχρι ἕκτης.»

Translation
No book shall be taken out, since we have sworn it. It will be open from the first hour until the sixth.

Note: On the epigraph Β(υ)βλίον is inscribed with "υ" and not "ι" βιβλίον - Originally βύβλος means Egyptian papyrus - a name that refers to the Phoenician city Βύβλος (Present-day Lebanon) that produced the plant.

== See also ==
- The Athenian Agora: Site Guide, Fifth Edition
- History of the American School of Classical Studies at Athens, 1939-1980
- List of libraries in Greece
