= Evangelos Marinakis =

Greek businessman and investor (born 1967)

- Ευάγγελος Μαρινάκης
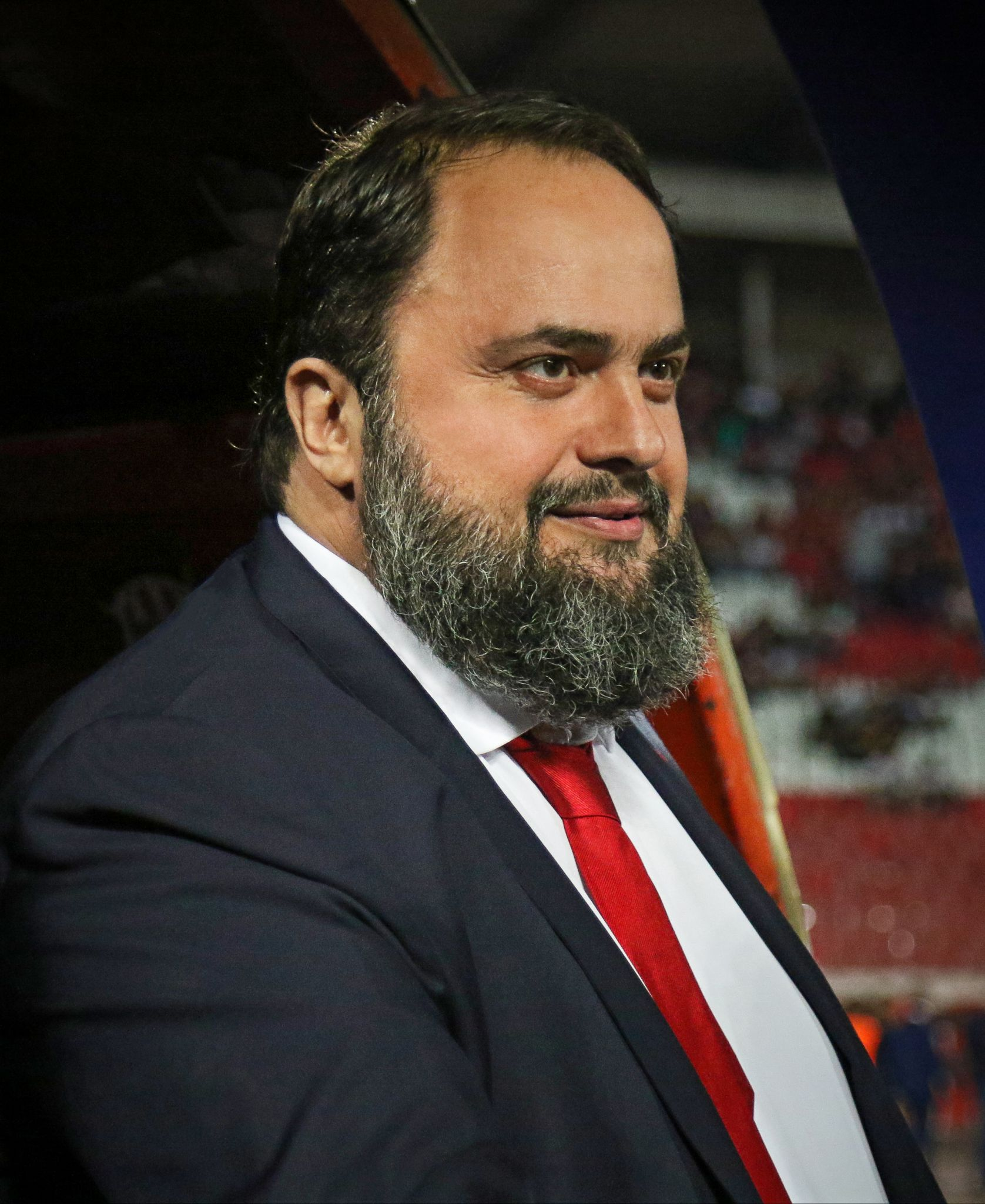
- Marinakis in 2021
- Born: 30 July 1967 (age 59); Piraeus, Greece
- Occupations: Businessman; shipowner; investor
- Board member of: Capital Group; Olympiacos; Nottingham Forest; Rio Ave; Alter Ego Media S.A. City councillor, Piraeus
- Spouse: Athanasia Marinakis
- Children: 4
- Relatives: Miltiadis Marinakis (father)

Evangelos "Vangelis" Marinakis (Ευάγγελος (Βαγγέλης) Μαρινάκης, born 30 July 1967) is a Greek businessman and investor. He is the principal shareholder of a number of companies operating in the shipping, media and football sectors and is the owner of football clubs Olympiacos, Nottingham Forest and Rio Ave. Marinakis is the son of shipowner and politician Miltiadis Marinakis from Crete. He entered the Greek shipping industry in 2005 by founding "Capital Maritime & Trading Corp". In 2010, he acquired a majority stake in the Greek football team Olympiacos and became its president.

In 2014, Marinakis was elected as a municipal councillor of Piraeus with the Πειραιάς Νικητής (Piraeus Victor) party and was re-elected in 2019. In 2017, he purchased English football team Nottingham Forest. In 2016, he entered the Greek media sector with Alter Ego Media S.A., which acquired Lambrakis Press Group (DOL) in 2017.

Marinakis is notable in both the shipping and football sectors. Lloyd's List has included him in its "One Hundred Most Influential People in the Shipping Industry" since 2010, ranking him 10th in the 2025 list.

Marinakis is more widely recognized for his significant involvement in football, which has been associated with various controversial allegations, including match-fixing and referee interference. However, he has been acquitted in all related cases. In 2018, he was also implicated in the Noor 1 ship case but was cleared of all charges because of insufficient evidence. Marinakis' involvement in Greek sporting, political and business worlds had led to him being labelled a Greek oligarch.

== Personal life ==
Evangelos Marinakis was born in Piraeus, Greece, on 30 July 1967. He is the only son of Miltiadis Marinakis and Irini Marinaki (née Karakatsani). His father, Miltiadis Marinakis, was born in Crete. He was a shipowner, a Member of the Greek Parliament and, at times, a financial supporter of Piraeus football club, Olympiacos. Marinakis holds a B.A. in 'International Business Administration' and an M.Sc. in 'International Relations'.

He has been married for many years to Athanasia Marinakis, and they have four children, three girls and a boy. His son Miltiades Marinakis, a London resident, has set up his own company, "Shopflix". The family's permanent residence in Athens is in Paleo Psychiko.

Marinakis and New Democracy politician Dora Bakoyannis are personally connected, as Marinakis was best man when Bakoyanni married Isidoros Kouvelos in 1998, and Bakoyannis became the godmother of his son, Miltiadis.

== Career ==
=== Shipping ===
Marinakis is the founder and chairman of Capital Maritime & Trading Corp. The Capital Maritime Group which is controlled by the Marinakis family, managed in 2025 a mixed fleet of more than 146 vessels, including tankers, container ships, LNG, LPG/ammonia, LCO2, offshore and dry bulk segments. Capital Group entered the LNG segment in 2018, ordering up to ten LNG ships of a total value of 1.8 billion.

From March 2010 until September 2011, Marinakis also served as Chairman and Chief Executive Officer of NYSE-listed Crude Carriers Corp. Between March 2007 and December 2014 he was chairman of Capital Product Partners L.P. (NASDAQ:CPLP). In November 2018, Capital Product Partners L.P. announced the merger of its tanker fleet with DSS Holdings, whose largest shareholder is WL Ross & Co., thus creating one of the biggest listed tanker companies in the world, in a transaction valued at $1.65bn.

From 1992 to 2005, Marinakis was the commercial manager of Capital Ship Management Corp. and oversaw the businesses of the group of companies that now form Capital Maritime. For the past decades, he has also been active in several other family-controlled businesses all related to the shipping industry.

On 5 December 2023, Marinakis, through his newly established company Capital Offshore, invested $106 million to purchase a fleet of seven platform supply vessels.

On 8 February 2024, Marinakis supported the establishment of the Maritime Emissions Reduction Centre (M-ERC) in Athens, a collaborative effort with Lloyd's Register aimed at reducing greenhouse gas emissions from the global fleet.

At the 181st graduation ceremony of the Massachusetts Maritime Academy held on 22 June 2024, Vangelis Marinakis was awarded an honorary doctorate.

In March 2025, Capital Clean Energy Carriers Corp., part of Marinakis’ Capital Group, became a founding member of the MIT Maritime Consortium, an international collaboration with MIT and ABS aimed at developing nuclear propulsion technologies and alternative fuels for commercial shipping.

In November 2025 Marinakis during a conference called on US and European authorities to allow sanctioned vessels to be scrapped within a three to four-month window arguing that these ships pose a threat to environment and the seas.

In February 2026, Capital Clean Energy Carriers Corp., part of Marinakis’ Capital Group, successfully completed an unsecured bond offering of 250 million euro at a 3.75% coupon with a seven-year maturity, listed on the Athens Stock Exchange with proceeds used to repay existing debt, fund capital expenditures for its newbuilding program, and support working capital.

On 17 March 2026, Capital Tankers Corp., a crude oil tanker company backed by Capital Maritime & Trading Corp. of Evangelos Marinakis, was listed on Euronext Growth Oslo. The company’s initial public offering became the largest capital raising ever carried out by a shipping company on the Oslo Stock Exchange, raising approximately $500 million and valuing the company at around $2 billion.

=== Municipal councillor ===
In May 2014, he opted to become involved in local government, specifically in the municipality of Piraeus, the city where he was born and raised. He participated in the independent ballot of the former Vice President of Olympiacos, Yannis Moralis, and was subsequently elected as a municipal councillor with 13,215 votes, the highest number of votes cast for any candidate from any faction.

The primary focus of his electoral campaign was his opposition to the privatization of the port, as planned by the government. He proposed that the Municipality of Piraeus assume control of the port's operations. (The operation of the port was ultimately sold to Cosco group in April 2016).

In light of the 2019 local elections, in which he was a candidate once more, the SYRIZA mayoral candidate made the following observation: "In approximately 104 meetings of the municipal council of Piraeus, during his term of office, Vangelis Marinakis was absent in approximately 80 of them, while in the remaining 24 he made an appearance as a guest."

Nevertheless, the electorate once more selected him as their preferred candidate for the city council, with a total of 15,816 votes.

=== Sports ===
Since mid-2010, Marinakis has owned Piraeus' hometown team Olympiacos, and serves as its president. Marinakis served as president of the Super League Greece and vice-president of the Hellenic Football Federation (HFF) from August 2010 until September 2011. During his presidency of Olympiacos, the team won the Greek League title for seven consecutive seasons from 2010–11 to 2016–17, as well as 2020 to 2022; and the National Cup for the 2011–12, 2012–13, 2014–15 and 2020 seasons. In May 2024, they won the UEFA Europa Conference League title against Fiorentina and became the first Greek club to win a European competition. Marinakis dedicated the success to the entire Greek people. In the same year Olympiacos won for the first time the UEFA Youth League in 2023 - 2024 after beating Milan 3–0.

In May 2017, it was announced that Marinakis had completed a transaction to become the majority shareholder in English Championship club and former double European Cup winners Nottingham Forest.

The Nottingham Post noted that Marinakis' acquisition of the club heralds "an exciting future that gives genuine reason for optimism". Meanwhile, manager Mark Warburton commented that he expected Marinakis and his team to be ambitious for Nottingham Forest. "They are aware of the club's stature and they are good football people," Warburton was quoted as saying.

Following his takeover of Forest, Marinakis aimed for the club to qualify for Europe within five years, as well as having a redeveloped stadium and training ground. Although Forest announced £50 million plans to redevelop to the City Ground and the Nigel Doughty Academy, on 29 June 2022, they won promotion to the Premier League for the first time in 23 years, justifying the efforts and dreams of Marinakis. In November 2023, he completed the takeover of Portuguese club Rio Ave, investing over €20.5 million to reportedly settle debts and upgrade facilities, in collaboration with football agent Jorge Mendes.

On 31 January 2024, Marinakis hosted a conference at the City Ground with Harvard University and the Lilian Thuram Foundation focusing on tackling racism and gender inequality in football.

=== Media ===
In September 2016, Marinakis, through his company Alter Ego Media, won one of four national television licenses auctioned in Greece after spending EUR 73.9m ($82.8m) in a highly unusual competitive bidding process. The license was however revoked on 26 October 2016 since the Greek Council of State held that the TV license law of Minister of State Nikos Pappas was unconstitutional.

In July 2017, Alter Ego was confirmed by a Greek first-instance court as the acquirer of the Lambrakis Press Group (DOL). The court approval for the transfer ownership of DOL to Alter Ego followed the latter's success as the highest bidder in an auction process held earlier in 2017. The court ratified the sale and granted a request by DOL staff that the auction procedure be accepted as valid. The completion of the transfer of ownership was also supported by trade unions representing DOL staff. DOL is one of Greece's historic major media groups, and includes the top selling Ta Nea and To Vima newspapers, two of the country's oldest dailies, as well as a popular news portal, magazines and a radio station. As of March 2018, the agreement for DOL has not yet been approved by the Competition Committee. It also holds a 22% stake in Mega Channel TV station.

In February 2021, Marinakis wrote the lyrics of the hit song "Excitement" ("Eksapsi") by Greek pop star Natassa Theodoridou. Following the song's release, it reached one million views on YouTube within the first six days.

On 27 January 2025, Alter Ego Media was officially listed on the Athens Stock Exchange, with demand for shares surpassing the offering by 11.9 times, successfully raising approximately 57 million euros.

=== Awards and distinctions ===
Having "grown his shipping empire from the small company he took over from his father, which controlled seven bulk carriers", he is regarded as one of the most important and influential shipping personalities worldwide. He was included in the Lloyd's List "One Hundred Most Influential People in the Shipping Industry" list, ranking 10th in 2025,, 16th in 2024, 22nd in 2023, 41st in 2022, 47th in 2021, 59th in 2020, 2019 and 2018, 66th in 2017, 61st in 2016, 65th in 2015, 67th in 2014, 73rd in 2013, 84th in 2012, 84th in 2011, and 88th in 2010. He was also included in the TradeWinds "Power 100" list of the ‘top shipowners and operators", ranking 31st in 2012 and 75th in 2010. In 2014 and 2010 he was awarded the "Newsmaker of the Year" award at the annual Lloyd's List "Greek Shipping Awards", while in 2009 his company, Capital Ship Management Corp. was awarded the "Tanker Company of the Year" award. In 2016, he was awarded the first ever "Xenakoudis Excellence in Shipping Award" by the International Registries, Inc./The Marshall Islands Registry. In November 2017, Marinakis received the Lloyd's List "Greek Shipping Personality of the Year" Award at a special ceremony in Athens. Nigel Lowry of Lloyd's List said Marinakis was the "outstanding candidate" for the award and noted his $1 billion investment in fleet capacity in 2017, his "dynamic dealmaking" in the shipping sector, as well as a range of other activities across philanthropy, sports and media.

On 15 November 2022, Marinakis received the Tanker Shipping & Trade Industry Leader Award.

On 1 December 2023, Marinakis received the Lloyd's List Greek Shipping Awards "Deal of the Decade" and "20 Year Achievement Award".

On 6 December 2024, Marinakis received the Lloyd's List Greek Shipping Awards "Tanker Company of the Year Award". The award recognized Capital Group's investments in technologies supporting the energy transition, including dual-fuel ammonia and LNG vessels, as well as large liquefied CO_{2} carriers.

== Philanthropy ==
He has a role as a philanthropist, both privately and as president of Olympiacos F.C. In July 2014, he pledged €80,000 annually for an initial ten-year period to support Nikos Kazantzakis museum in Crete; this has become a permanent sponsorship, which has continued uninterrupted for more than a decade and has been credited with covering operating costs, enabling staffing and expanding outreach. In September 2014, he privately financed commemorative celebrations for the 200 years since the foundation of the Filiki Etairia and the creation of a bust of Alexander Ypsilantis in Athens. He has also privately supported throughout the years various Greek children charities, including Argo, and 'Together for Children', a union of ten Greek NGOs.

During his presidency, Olympiacos has funded the daily meals of a thousand people weekly, through the benevolent fund of "Genesios Theotokos" parish in the Athens suburb of Nikaia and the Syros Holy Church. In 2010, Olympiacos hosted a UNDP Match Against Poverty which raised over US$500,000 for earthquake stricken Haiti and Pakistan. Approximately a thousand food portions and clothing items were distributed daily to refugees stranded at the Port of Piraeus. In February 2014, he donated €500,000 for school repairs in the Greek island of Cephalonia, which was hit by destructive earthquakes. In October 2013, Olympiacos and UNICEF launched a partnership to immunize children in developing countries, featuring UNICEF’s logo on the players’ jerseys, with the target to raise €2 million in two years. In August 2017, the club announced that the partnership would be renewed with a focus on a new multi-year campaign. In June 2012, Marinakis repurchased Greek national debt, with a face value of €1,364,000 by offering the amount of €168,590 on behalf of each of Olympiacos' 55 Greek players and employees, to Peter Nomikos’ NGO ‘Greece Debt Free’ (GDF). In the past, Olympiacos has supported the Japan earthquake relief fund, and acted in support to the non-profit environmental organization Arcturos, the pediatric clinics of St Sofia hospital in Athens and the General Hospital in Limassol, various blood collection campaigns, Greek and international children's charities, including Elpida, the Steven Gerrard Foundation, the Hatzikyriakos Foundation. Marinakis is also in the process of creating the Olympiacos charity foundation.

In September 2017, Marinakis sponsored a special conference in Athens in partnership with Harvard University, to focus on football's social responsibility, with specific reference to refugees. At the event, Marinakis said: "football can cross borders, overcome ancient enmity and bring millions of people around the world together". In November 2017, Marinakis led an aid effort, through Olympiacos, to bring relief to the victims of massive flooding that hit the town of Mandra in the Attica region of Greece. The effort, included a large quantity of food, bottled water, and other daily necessities sent to those struggling in the aftermath of the flooding. In July 2018, Marinakis donated €1 million through Olympiacos, to help the victims of the deadliest wildfires to hit Greece in decades, which swept through an area near Athens. "In these difficult times, all us Greeks need to stand united at the side of our fellow citizens who suffer", the team said in a statement. In April 2019, fundraising was completed for the creation of the "Miltiadis Marinakis Professorship for Modern Greek Language and Culture" at the Ohio State University where the local Greek community raised $1 million with Evangelos Marinakis as lead sponsor. This move will safeguard the operation of the OSU ‘Modern Greek Studies’ department that was destined to close. In November 2020, Nottingham Forest supported Framework's Homeless to Home Challenge major fundraising campaign to combat homelessness. Marinakis was praised for the tremendous support. In the same month, Nottingham Forest also supported Football Shirt Friday going the extra mile. Marinakis was commended for his ongoing community support. In December 2020, Angeliki Frangou and Marinakis teamed up to present a $1.8 million donation to an Athens hospital. The money funded 12 new intensive care beds.

On 2 November 2025, Marinakis offered free private healthcare to victims affected by the 2025 Cambridgeshire train stabbing, in which a Nottingham Forest season-ticket holder was injured while protecting a young girl.

On 15 December 2025, the Hellenic Olympic Committee announced that Marinakis, through his company, had undertaken the costs of renovating the Panathenaic Stadium, as well as he will sponsor the illumination of the facade of the HOC headquarters.

== Controversies ==
=== Sport ===
On 21 February 2011, Olympiacos beat Panathinaikos in Karaiskaki Stadium (2–1), after a controversial game regarding the referee's decisions. After the game, player Djibril Cissé had a wrangle with Olympiacos' president Marinakis. Cissé was beaten by Olympiacos fans and stated that he was going to appeal to the UEFA. The case of Cissé and Marinakis went to the Greek courts, where Marinakis was found not guilty.

In 2015, the Public Prosecutor and the Council of Judges acquitted Marinakis in relation to the Koriopolis match-fixing investigation, that begun in 2011, that was launched after UEFA gave Greek authorities a report citing irregular betting patterns, mostly involving Greek Cup and second division games in 2009 and 2010.

In 2014, Marinakis was acquitted by the Three Members Court of First Instance relatively to the case of entering the referee's (Thanassis Yiachos's) locker room at halftime during the football cup final between Olympiacos and Asteras Tripolis, against football regulations to complain about the decisions taken. Marinakis stated that he went to the referee's locker room at halftime only to wish match officials "good luck". Olympiacos went on and won the match 3–1, after a tense 1–1 at halftime. In 2015 Marinakis was also acquitted by the Three Members Court of Appeals for the same case.

Another investigation which led to the 2015 Greek football scandal, started in 2014 after prosecutor Aristidis Koreas was given the go-ahead by a council of judges to make use of secretly recorded phone conversations that point to the involvement of various sports officials, including Evangelos Marinakis. Marinakis's involvement was related to the Olympiacos–Veria match in 2013, which ended 3–0 in favor of Olympiacos. During the investigative stage, the judge imposed a restraining order on him prohibiting any involvement in football activities. Marinakis also resigned from his position as president of the team for legal reasons, handing over his role to Yiannis Moralis. He repeatedly denied all charges: "These allegations have nothing to do with me and have no effect on me whatsoever," Marinakis said. "There is not one shred of evidence against me."

In November 2017, the judicial council of the Court of Appeals dropped various charges after deeming them "absolutely groundless". On 26 March 2018, Marinakis was vindicated by the Greek Supreme Court. The decision of the Greek Supreme Court confirmed that the allegations against him were unfounded. In April 2019, the Supreme Civil and Criminal Court of Greece decided that Marinakis, along with the other 27, will have a trial for the 2015 Greek football scandal. The final accusations are the felony crime of "match fixing" and creation of a gang, instead of a criminal organization.

On 28 January 2021, the three-member criminal court of appeal unanimously acquitted Marinakis and 27 others of match-fixing, in a case stretching back several years. Athens judges ruled that there is no evidence for the two charges attributed to the defendants, following their alleged participation in a criminal group including altering the outcome of matches.

Finally, Marinakis was permanently acquitted by the Ethics Committee for the category of match-fixing.

AEK and Veria football player Nikos Georgeas was sentenced to six months in prison by the Three-member Misdemeanor Court of Athens for perjury regarding the Olympiacos–Veria match in January 2013.

In October 2024, he was banned for five matches after spitting at match officials after his team Nottingham Forest lost 1–0 in their Premier League match against Fulham. Marinakis claimed that the incident was unintentional as he had developed a cough from smoking cigars, but an independent regulatory commission refuted his claim on review of security camera footage.

=== Noor 1 case ===
A Greek drug trafficking investigation that started in 2014, regarding Noor 1, a ship owned by Pantelis Kalafatis, was investigated by the Greek Coast Guard, the DEA and the Greek judicial authorities and culminated in the conviction of various individuals and two arrest warrants for Turkish nationals.

In March 2018, Marinakis was charged with drug trafficking. The accusations against Marinakis were described as "very serious charges" following an investigation after the tanker Noor 1 was intercepted at the Greek port of Piraeus carrying 2.1 tonnes of heroin in 2014. According to the jailed co-owner of Noor 1, Efthymios Yiannousakis, the vessel had in fact carried an additional ton of heroin (worth $70 million) which was unloaded on the island of Crete and trafficked to mainland Europe before Greek authorities managed to intercept the rest of the cargo. The judicial council of the Piraeus Lower Court touched on all related issues and ruled that the prosecutor's order was not justified.

Nottingham Forest F.C. chairman Nicholas Randall wrote an open letter to supporters reaffirming his support for Evangelos Marinakis. Randall confirmed the matter was under investigation but that "there is no 'charge' against Marinakis and no 'prosecution' is in process."

In January 2021, the judge came to the conclusion that there was no evidence implicating Marinakis, and therefore concluded his investigation. The Piraeus Appeals Prosecutor disagreed with the investigator's proposal and returned the case file for further investigation requesting the conduct of additional investigative acts, a proposal with which the investigator disagreed. The dispute was called upon to be resolved by the judicial council, which of its own volition decided that the interrogation should continue, now separated from the Turkish financiers and traffickers of the heroin.

In January 2025, the Piraeus Magistrate's Council of Judges ruled that there was insufficient evidence to press charges against Marinakis and others, bringing the investigation to an end after six years. The court referenced reports from the Financial Police Directorate and the DEA which found no link between Marinakis and the financing of the heroin shipment aboard the Noor 1. The court also reviewed various witness testimonies including that of journalist Alexander Clapp, stating that the evidence cited in his article "The Vampire Ship" and submitted to the investigation was contradicted by the case file and considered unreliable.

=== Giorgos Lyggeridis case ===
In April 2025, Marinakis' name was implicated in the court case of Giorgos Lyggeridis, a police officer who died on December 7, 2023, outside the Melina Merkouri indoor hall after violent incidents. The case involves more than 140 Olympiacos Gate 7 fans as defendants for criminal organization in acts of violence, while at the same time Marinakis and 4 members of the Olympiacos administration are being referred to trial for the offenses of supporting and financing the above-indicted fans as well as for inciting sports violence (with misdemeanor charges). The trial was to be held on November 5, 2025.

=== Political influence ===
Marinakis, along with a few other businessmen, (Note: Ivan Savvidis, Dimitris Melissanidis, Giannis Alafouzos,) was labelled an oligarch by Alexis Tsipras and the former Syriza government because of his significant political influence in Greece, especially through media acquisitions such as Mega, ΔΟΛ, Eleftherotypia and the "Argos" distribution agency. Initially a supporter of Kyriakos Mitsotakis and the New Democracy government, Marinakis later withdrew his support, particularly over a wiretapping scandal involving allegations of government surveillance on his associates.

During the 2026 EuroLeague Final Four held at the Telekom Center, Marinakis and high-ranking New Democracy member Grigoris Dimitriadis exchanged insults and punches with each other for unknown reasons.
