= General State Archives (Greece) =

National archives of Greece

Coordinates: 38.0015°N 23.7662°E

The General State Archives (Greek: Γενικά Αρχεία του Κράτους, romanized: Geniká Archeía tou Krátous) are the national archives of Greece. They were created in 1914 by Eleftherios Venizelos' government. The collections include the archives of various government ministries (Ecclesiastical and Public Education, Finance, Military, Development, National Land, Council of State, former Exchange Fund, Electoral Archive of the Hellenic parliament).
