= Greek Film Archive =

Coordinates: 37.9809°N 23.7125°E

- Predecessor: Athens cinema club
- Formation: 1963
- Legal status: Active
- Purpose: To produce and spread greek and international films
- Headquarters: Athens
- Secretary General: Maria Komninou
- Honorary President: Nikos Koundouras
- President: Theodoros adamopoulos
- Vice President: Ioannis Anastasios Metaxas
- Key people: Pantelis Voulgaris; Manos Eustratiadis; Nikos Kavoukidis; Vasso Karabetsou; Maria komninou Valeri Kontaki; Tina Pishintzi; Afroditi Lita
- Website: www.tainiothiki.gr

The Greek Film Archive (Greek: Ταινιοθήκη της Ελλάδος, Tainiothiki tis Ellados) is a nonprofit film archive organization located in Athens, Greece, whose goal is to produce and spread Greek and international films. It's a part of International Federation of Film Archives and a founding member of the European Film Gateway. It is also co-operating with the Thessaloniki International Film Festival.

Located in the Lais theatre in kerameikos, it consists of four departments.

1. Laboratories for the restoration, conservation and safekeeping of archival material
2. Library
3. Digital reading room
4. Museum

== History ==
The organization was founded in 1963, with the 105/1963 royal decree and is a successor to the Athens cinema club which was founded in 1950 from the Athens film critics union. The first president of the organization was Aglaia Mitropoulou, who thanks to her friendship with the director of the Cinémathèque Française Henri Langlois, managed to get ahold of many films.

On 4 December 2014, The Greek Film Archive was declared by the Hellenic Parliament, as an official body that reserves film heritage.

During the 37th Cinéma du réel, which took place in Paris, the Greek Film Archive was honored as the honorary film archive of the year.

== Archives ==
The archive consists of more than 10.000 films, of which 600 are of Greek origin.

== Purpose ==
- The collection of films of any kind, Greek or foreign, their classification, conservation, (restoration as required), safekeeping as well as their promotion through public screenings.
- The gathering and conservation of cinematographic documents (photographs, articles, books, screenplays, set models, newspapers, costumes, advertising material, programmes, and, in general, anything that has to do with the history of Cinema).
- Maintaining contact with similar foreign organizations and FIAF, as well as the development of cultural and artistic relations and the joint hosting of events.
- The organization of regular screenings, research into the technical and historical development of the cinema, and, finally, the creation of the Museum of Cinematography

== See also ==
- List of film archives
- Cinema of Greece
