= 2011–12 PFC Levski Sofia season =

Levski Sofia
2011–12 season
- Chairman: Todor Batkov
- Manager: Georgi Ivanov (until 7 November 2011); Nikolay Kostov (until 26 March 2012); Georgi Ivanov (until 4 April 2012); Yasen Petrov (until end of season)
- A Group: Third place
- Bulgarian Cup: Quarterfinals
- UEFA Europa League: Third Round
- Top goalscorer: League: Ivan Tsvetkov (11); All: Ivan Tsvetkov (14)
- Highest home attendance: 20 000 vs CSKA Sofia (29 April 2012)
- Lowest home attendance: 0 vs Lokomotiv Plovdiv (6 November 2011)
Home colours	Away colours

The 2011–12 season is Levski Sofia's 90th season in the First League. This article shows player statistics and all matches (official and friendly) that the club has played during the 2011–12 season.

== Transfers ==
=== Summer transfers ===
In:

No.	Pos.	Nation	Player
30	MF	BUL	Lachezar Baltanov (loan return from Kaliakra Kavarna)
20	DF	BUL	Aleksandar Bashliev (from Pirin Blagoevgrad)
19	FW	BUL	Ivan Tsvetkov (from Pirin Blagoevgrad)
11	MF	BUL	Simeon Raykov (from Botev Vratsa)
21	MF	BUL	Todor Hristov (from Beroe)
6	DF	BUL	Orlin Starokin (from Chernomorets)
9	FW	NED	Sjoerd Ars (from (Netherlands) Zwolle)
8	FW	ESP	Toni Calvo (free agent, previously at (Greece) Aris)
33	DF	SWE	Fredrik Risp (free agent, previously at (Denmark) Esbjerg)

Out:

No.	Pos.	Nation	Player
6	MF	BEL	Jeanvion Yulu-Matondo (end of contract)
7	MF	BUL	Aleksandar Aleksandrov (end of contract)
9	FW	MLI	Garra Dembele (to (Germany) SC Freiburg)
14	DF	BUL	Veselin Minev (to (Turkey) Antalyaspor)
20	MF	BUL	Ivan Goranov (to Beroe)
28	FW	BUL	Aleksandar Kirov (to Chernomorets)
29	FW	BUL	Ismail Isa (to (Turkey) Karabükspor)
—	MF	BUL	Borislav Baldzhiyski (to Chernomorets)
—	MF	GHA	Michael Tawiah (released)
—	DF	BUL	Kalin Shtarkov (released)

See List of Bulgarian football transfers summer 2011

=== Winter transfers ===
In:

No.	Pos.	Nation	Player
—	DF	POR	Nuno Pinto (from (Portugal) Nacional Madeira)
—	FW	POR	Cristovão (from (Cyprus) Anorthosis Famagusta)
—	DF	MLI	Souleymane Diamoutene (from (Italy) US Lecce)
—	FW	BRA	Jose Carlos Junior (on loan from Slavia Sofia)

Out:

No.	Pos.	Nation	Player
30	MF	BUL	Lachezar Baltanov (on loan to Botev Vratsa)
14	DF	MNE	Marko Vidovic (released)
33	DF	SWE	Fredrik Risp (to (Cyprus) Ethnikos Achnas)
16	MF	BUL	Marian Ognyanov (to Botev Plovdiv)
9	FW	NED	Sjoerd Ars (on loan to (China) Tianjin Teda F.C.)
85	GK	BUL	Kiril Akalski (released)
21	FW	BUL	Todor Hristov (to Beroe Stara Zagora)

See List of Bulgarian football transfers winter 2011–12

== Squad ==
As of July 6, 2011 Note: Flags indicate national team as defined under FIFA eligibility rules; some limited exceptions apply. Players may hold more than one non-FIFA nationality.

No.	Pos.	Nation	Player
2	DF	NED	Dustley Mulder
3	MF	NED	Serginho Greene
4	DF	BUL	Stefan Stanchev
5	DF	BUL	Ivo Ivanov
6	DF	BUL	Orlin Starokin
7	MF	BUL	Daniel Dimov
8	FW	ESP	Toni Calvo
10	MF	BUL	Hristo Yovov
11	FW	BUL	Simeon Raykov
12	FW	BRA	Juninho (on loan from Slavia Sofia)
14	MF	BUL	Radoslav Tsonev
15	FW	BUL	Stivan Petkov
16	FW	POR	Cristovão

No.	Pos.	Nation	Player
17	FW	BUL	Daniel Mladenov
18	MF	BUL	Borislav Tsonev
19	FW	BUL	Ivan Tsvetkov
20	DF	BUL	Aleksandar Bashliev
22	MF	MKD	Darko Tasevski
23	GK	BUL	Plamen Iliev (Captain)
24	GK	BUL	Bozhidar Mitrev
25	DF	MLI	Souleymane Diamoutene
26	DF	BUL	Hristo Popadiyn
28	DF	POR	Nuno Pinto
30	FW	BUL	Antonio Vutov
45	MF	BUL	Vladimir Gadzhev (Vice Captain)
55	DF	BUL	Yordan Miliev

== Statistics ==
No.	Pos.	Name	League		Bulgarian Cup		Europa League		Total		Discipline	
No.	Pos.	Name	Apps	Goals	Apps	Goals	Apps	Goals	Apps	Goals	Yellow card	Red card
2	DF	(Netherlands) Dustley Mulder	24	0	3	0	2	0	27	0	6	0
3	MF	(Netherlands) Serginho Greene	18+1	0	2+1	0	2	0	24	1	5	1
4	DF	(Bulgaria) Stefan Stanchev	2+3	0	0	0	0	0	5	0	2	1
5	DF	(Bulgaria) Ivo Ivanov	10+1	0	2	0	0	0	13	0	3	1
6	DF	(Bulgaria) Orlin Starokin	22+3	1	2	0	2	0	29	0	2	1
7	MF	(Bulgaria) Daniel Dimov	9+4	2	2	1	0+1	0	16	4	6	1
8	FW	(Spain) Toni Calvo	17+1	6	2+1	1	0+1	0	22	6	9	1
10	MF	(Bulgaria) Hristo Yovov	19+5	8	2	0	2	0	28	8	4	2
11	MF	(Bulgaria) Simeon Raykov	12+7	4	0	0	0+2	0	21	4	1	0
12	FW	(Brazil) Jose Carlos Junior	11+2	6	1	0	0	0	14	6	2	1
14	MF	(Bulgaria) Radoslav Tsonev	0	0	0+1	0	0	0	1	0	0	0
15	FW	(Bulgaria) Stivan Petkov	0+1	0	0	0	0	0	1	0	0	0
15	MF	(Bulgaria) Nikola Yanachkov	0+1	0	0	0	0	0	1	0	0	0
16	FW	(Portugal) Cristovão	12	3	1	0	0	0	13	3	2	1
18	MF	(Bulgaria) Borislav Tsonev	0	0	0+1	0	0	0	1	0	0	0
17	FW	(Bulgaria) Daniel Mladenov	4+9	1	1	0	2	0	16	2	4	0
19	FW	(Bulgaria) Ivan Tsvetkov	12+15	11	2+1	3	2	0	31	14	3	0
20	DF	(Bulgaria) Aleksandar Bashliev	3+2	0	0+1	0	0	0	6	0	1	0
21	FW	(Bulgaria) Tsvetelin Tonev	0+1	0	0	0	0	0	1	0	0	0
22	MF	(North Macedonia) Darko Tasevski	16+3	2	2	0	1	0	21	2	2	0
23	GK	(Bulgaria) Plamen Iliev	29	0	2	0	2	0	32	0	3	0
24	GK	(Bulgaria) Bozhidar Mitrev	0+1	0	1+1	0	0	0	3	0	1	0
25	DF	(Mali) Souleymane Diamoutene	11	1	1	0	0	0	12	1	1	0
28	DF	(Portugal) Nuno Pinto	11	0	1	0	0	0	12	0	3	0
30	FW	(Bulgaria) Antonio Vutov	1+4	0	0	0	0	0	5	0	1	0
45	MF	(Bulgaria) Vladimir Gadzhev	26	4	2	0	2	1	30	4	10	0
55	DF	(Bulgaria) Yordan Miliev	19+1	0	2	0	2	0	24	0	6	0
Players sold or loaned out after the start of the season:
9	FW	(Netherlands) Sjoerd Ars	9+4	6	0	0	1+1	2	15	8	1	0
14	DF	(Montenegro) Marko Vidović	2+1	0	1	0	0	0	4	0	1	0
16	MF	(Bulgaria) Marian Ognyanov	1+4	0	0	0	0	0	5	0	0	0
21	MF	(Bulgaria) Todor Hristov	3+3	1	0+1	0	0+1	0	8	1	1	0
30	MF	(Bulgaria) Lachezar Baltanov	1+7	0	0+1	0	0	0	9	0	0	0
33	DF	(Sweden) Fredrik Risp	3	0	0	0	2	0	5	0	1	0
85	GK	(Bulgaria) Kiril Akalski	0	0	0	0	0	0	0	0	0	0

=== Goalscorers ===
Players	League	Cup	Europa League	Total
(Bulgaria) Ivan Tsvetkov	11	3	0	14
(Netherlands) Sjoerd Ars	6	0	2	8
(Bulgaria) Hristo Yovov	8	0	0	8
(Brazil) Juninho	6	0	0	6
(Bulgaria) Vladimir Gadzhev	6	0	1	7
(Spain) Toni Calvo	6	0	1	7
(North Macedonia) Darko Tasevski	4	0	0	4
(Bulgaria) Simeon Raykov	4	0	0	4
(Bulgaria) Daniel Dimov	3	0	0	3
(Portugal) Cristovão	3	0	0	3
(Bulgaria) Daniel Mladenov	2	0	0	2
(Bulgaria) Orlin Starokin	1	0	0	1
(Mali) Souleymane Diamoutene	1	0	0	1

=== Assists ===
Player	League	Cup	Europa League	Total
(Bulgaria) Vladimir Gadzhev	4	2	0	6
(Brazil) Juninho	6	0	0	6
(Bulgaria) Daniel Mladenov	4	0	1	5
(Portugal) Nuno Pinto	5	0	0	5
(Bulgaria) Simeon Raykov	3	0	1	4
(Bulgaria) Ivan Tsvetkov	4	0	0	4
(North Macedonia) Darko Tasevski	3	0	0	3
(Bulgaria) Hristo Yovov	2	0	0	2
(Portugal) Cristovão	1	0	1	2
(Spain) Toni Calvo	1	0	0	1
(Netherlands) Sjoerd Ars	1	0	0	1
(Bulgaria) Orlin Starokin	1	0	0	1
(Bulgaria) Todor Hristov	1	0	0	1
(Bulgaria) Stefan Stanchev	1	0	0	1
(Netherlands) Dustley Mulder	1	0	0	1

=== Cards ===
Player	Yellow card	Red card	Total
(Bulgaria) Vladimir Gadzhev	10	0	10
(Spain) Toni Calvo	9	1	10
(Bulgaria) Yordan Miliev	7	0	7
(Bulgaria) Daniel Dimov	6	1	7
(Netherlands) Dustley Mulder	6	0	6
(Netherlands) Serginho Greene	4	1	5
(Bulgaria) Hristo Yovov	3	2	5
(Bulgaria) Ivo Ivanov	3	1	4
(Bulgaria) Ivan Tsvetkov	3	0	3
(Bulgaria) Daniel Mladenov	3	0	3
(Brazil) Juninho	2	1	3
(Bulgaria) Orlin Starokin	2	1	3
(Portugal) Cristovão	3	0	3
(Bulgaria) Plamen Iliev	3	0	3
(Portugal) Nuno Pinto	3	0	3
(North Macedonia) Darko Tasevski	2	0	2
(Bulgaria) Stefan Stanchev	1	1	2
(Bulgaria) Bozhidar Mitrev	1	0	1
(Sweden) Fredrik Risp	1	0	1
(Montenegro) Marko Vidović	1	0	1
(Bulgaria) Simeon Raykov	1	0	1
(Bulgaria) Aleksandar Bashliev	1	0	1
(Netherlands) Sjoerd Ars	1	0	1
(Mali) Souleymane Diamoutene	1	0	1
(Bulgaria) Antonio Vutov	1	0	1

== Pre-season and friendlies ==
=== Summer ===
2 July 2011	Lokomotiv Sofia	0–1	Levski Sofia	Sofia
18:00 EET		Report	Tsvetkov 48'	Stadium: Lokomotiv; Attendance: 4 000; Referee: Nikolay Yordanov

8 July 2011	Levski Sofia (Bulgaria)	4–0	(Hungary) Lombard-Pápa TFC	Enzesfeld-Lindabrunn
19:00 EET	Mladenov 7'; Ars 21'; Tsvetkov 33'; Starokin 76'	Report

9 July 2011	Levski Sofia (Bulgaria)	2–0	(Romania) FCM Târgu Mureş	Enzesfeld-Lindabrunn
19:00 EET	Mladenov 10'; Tsvetkov 57'	Report

11 July 2011	Levski Sofia (Bulgaria)	2–3	(Romania) FC Petrolul Ploieşti	Enzesfeld-Lindabrunn
19:00 EET	Dimov 6'; Greene 41'	Report	Komazec 51', 58', 76'

13 July 2011	Levski Sofia (Bulgaria)	0–0	(Russia) Amkar	Enzesfeld-Lindabrunn
20:00 EET		Report

16 July 2011	Levski Sofia (Bulgaria)	0–0	(Czech Republic) Slovácko	Enzesfeld-Lindabrunn
19:00 EET		Report

19 July 2011	Levski Sofia (Bulgaria)	1–1	(Israel) Ashdod	Enzesfeld-Lindabrunn
19:00 EET	Raykov 68'	Report	Mizrahi 30'

2 September 2011	Slavia Sofia	1–2	Levski Sofia	Sofia
17:00 EET	Junior 33'	Report	Filipov 21' (o.g.); Hristov 59'	Stadium: Ovcha Kupel; Attendance: 300; Referee: Georgi Dimitrov

7 October 2011	Septemvri Simitli	1–2	Levski Sofia	Simitli
16:00 EET	Stoyanov 34'	Report	Ars 4'; Hristov 43'	Stadium: Struma; Referee: Ivaylo Ganchev

=== Winter ===
16 January 2012	Levski Sofia (Bulgaria)	9–0	(Cyprus) Ayia Napa F.C.	Ayia Napa
15:00 EET	Calvo 12', 35'; Tsvetkov 26'; Tasevski 30'; R. Tsonev 53'; Ars 55'; Hristov 72'; Vutov 82' (pen.); B. Tsonev 84' (pen.)	Report		Referee: Georgi Donkov

22 January 2012	Levski Sofia (Bulgaria)	1–1	(Russia) Rubin Kazan	Antalya
17:00 EET	Toni Calvo 41'	Report	Uridia 53'

26 January 2012	Levski Sofia (Bulgaria)	1–2	(Ukraine) Tavriya	Antalya
17:30 EET	Tasevski 85' (pen.)	Report	Feschuk 75' 90'

29 January 2012	Levski Sofia (Bulgaria)	1–2	(Romania) Steaua	Antalya
EET	Tsvetkov 38'	Report	Tănase 40' (pen.); Rusescu 75' (pen.)

5 February 2012	Levski Sofia (Bulgaria)	1–1	(Ukraine) Zorya	Antalya
EET	Tsvetkov 76'	Report	Idahor 60'

8 February 2012	Levski Sofia (Bulgaria)	1–0	(Russia) Krasnodar	Antalya
EET	Starokin 50'	Report

11 February 2012	Levski Sofia (Bulgaria)	1–2	(Belarus) BATE Borisov	Antalya
EET	Tsvetkov 80'	Report	Rudzik 32'; Maycon 47'

19 February 2012	Levski Sofia	1–0	Lokomotiv Sofia	Sofia
13:30 EET	Calvo 56'	Report		Stadium: Georgi Asparuhov

26 February 2012	Septemvri Simitli	0–4	Levski Sofia	Sandanski
13:30 EET		Report	Tsvetkov 20' (pen.) 32'; Jose Junior 23'; Tsonev 87'	Stadium: Sandanski Stadium

== Competitions ==
=== A Group ===
==== Table ====
Pos	Team	Pld	W	D	L	GF	GA	GD	Pts	Qualification or relegation
1	Ludogorets Razgrad (C)	30	22	4	4	73	16	+57	70	Qualification for Champions League second qualifying round
2	CSKA Sofia	30	22	3	5	60	19	+41	69	Qualification for Europa League second qualifying round
3	Levski Sofia	30	20	2	8	61	28	+33	62	Qualification for Europa League second qualifying round
4	Chernomorets Burgas	30	17	9	4	57	23	+34	60	
5	Litex Lovech	30	17	8	5	57	28	+29	59	

Source: A PFG (in Bulgarian)
Rules for classification: 1st points; 2nd head-to-head points; 3rd head-to-head goal difference; 4th head-to-head goals scored; 5th head-to-head away goals scored; 6th goal difference; 7th goals scored
(C) Champions

==== Results summary ====
Overall								Home						Away					
Pld	W	D	L	GF	GA	GD	Pts	W	D	L	GF	GA	GD	W	D	L	GF	GA	GD
30	20	2	8	61	28	+33	62	12	1	2	34	12	+22	8	1	6	27	16	+11

Source: Competitive matches

==== Results by round ====
Round	1	2	3	4	5	6	7	8	9	10	11	12	13	14	15	16	17	18	19	20	21	22	23	24	25	26	27	28	29	30
Ground	H	A	H	H	A	H	A	H	A	H	A	H	A	H	A	H	A	A	A	H	A	H	A	H	A	H	A	H	A	H
Result	W	L	W	W	W	W	L	W	L	W	L	W	W	W	W	W	W	W	W	L	L	L	D	D	W	W	L	W	W	W
Position	4	7	7	5	6	4	5	4	4	4	5	5	4	4	4	4	3	3	3	3	4	5	5	5	4	4	6	5	3	3

A = Away; H = Home; W = Win; D = Draw; L = Loss

==== Fixtures and results ====
8 August 2011 1	Levski Sofia	1–0	Slavia Sofia	Sofia
20:00 (EET)	Tsvetkov 26'	Report		Stadium: Georgi Asparuhov; Attendance: 2,030; Referee: Ivaylo Stoyanov (Petrich)

13 August 2011 2	Cherno More	3–1	Levski Sofia	Varna
18:00 (EET)	Kapitanov 36'; Palomino 51'; Petkov 90+3'	Report	Tsvetkov 70'	Stadium: Ticha; Attendance: 8,780; Referee: Tasko Taskov (Sofia)

21 August 2011 3	Levski Sofia	1–0	Montana	Sofia
18:00 (EET)	Ars 10' (pen.)	Report		Stadium: Georgi Asparuhov; Attendance: 710; Referee: Ivan Kirilov (Varna)

27 August 2011 4	Levski Sofia	3–0	Botev Vratsa	Sofia
20:00 (EET)	Gadzhev 30'; Ars 45'; Raykov 45+1'	Report		Stadium: Georgi Asparuhov; Attendance: 1,150; Referee: Nikola Popov (Sofia)

11 September 2011 5	Minyor Pernik	0–1	Levski Sofia	Pernik
17:00 (EET)		Report	Mladenov 67'	Stadium: Minyor Stadium; Attendance: 3,900; Referee: Stanislav Todorov (Shumen)

17 September 2011 6	Levski Sofia	3–2	Litex Lovech	Sofia
20:30 (EET)	Tasevski 12'; Raykov 43'; Gadzhev 74'	Report	Djermanovic 55'; Josse 71'	Stadium: Georgi Asparuhov; Attendance: 6,430; Referee: Ivaylo Stoyanov (Petrich)

25 September 2011 7	Ludogorets	2–1	Levski Sofia	Razgrad
17:00 (EET)	Ivanov 11'; Gargorov 52'	Report	Gadzhev 29'	Stadium: Ludogorets Arena; Attendance: 6,190; Referee: Georgi Yordanov (Gabrovo)

2 October 2011 8	Levski Sofia	4–0	Lokomotiv Sofia	Sofia
18:00 (EET)	Yovov 6', 30'; Ars 18'; Tasevski 37'	Report		Stadium: Georgi Asparuhov; Attendance: 1,630; Referee: Anton Genov (Sofia)

16 October 2011 9	Chernomorets Burgas	2–0	Levski Sofia	Burgas
18:00 (EET)	Jugu 68'; Anicet 71'	Report		Stadium: Lazur; Attendance: 5,000; Referee: Nikolay Yordanov (Sofia)

21 October 2011 10	Levski Sofia	3–2	Kaliakra Kavarna	Sofia
18:00 (EET)	Toni Calvo 3'; Mladenov 25'; Gadzhev 53'	Report	Sadula 18'; Hronec 88'	Stadium: Georgi Asparuhov; Attendance: 550; Referee: Vihren Manev (Sofia)

28 October 2011 11	CSKA Sofia	1–0	Levski Sofia	Sofia
17:45 (EET)	Zicu 26'	Report		Stadium: Vasil Levski; Attendance: 8,970; Referee: Tasko Taskov (Sofia)

6 November 2011 12	Levski Sofia	3–2	Lokomotiv Plovdiv	Sofia
16:30 (EET)	Tsvetkov 16'; Ars 76', 77'	Report	de Carvalho 29'; Miliev 41' (o.g.)	Stadium: Georgi Asparuhov; Attendance: 0 Referee: Georgi Yordanov (Gabrovo)

13 November 2011 13	Beroe	1–2	Levski Sofia	Stara Zagora
16:00 (EET)	Zlatinov 89'	Report	Yovov 32' 61'	Stadium: Beroe; Attendance: 7,000; Referee: Stanislav Todorov (Shumen)

19 November 2011 14	Levski Sofia	2–1	Vidima-Rakovski	Sofia
16:30 (EET)	Tasevski 1'; Ars 50'	Report	Kakalov 20'	Stadium: Georgi Asparuhov; Attendance: 1,100; Referee: Georgi Dimitrov (Sofia)

27 November 2011 15	Svetkavitsa	0–1	Levski Sofia	Targovishte
13:30 (EET)		Report	Dimov 60'	Stadium: Dimitar Burkov; Attendance: 4,000; Referee: Nikola Popov

21 March 2012 16	Slavia Sofia	0–3	Levski Sofia	Sofia
(EET)		Report	Tsvetkov 28' (pen.); Tasevski 63'; Toni Calvo 78'	Stadium: Slavia; Attendance: 4,500; Referee: Georgi Kabakov

4 March 2012 17	Levski Sofia	2–1	Cherno More	Sofia
13:30 (EET)	Tsvetkov 43'; Cristovão 75'	Report	Atanasov 85'	Stadium: Georgi Asparuhov; Attendance: 6,820; Referee: Stefan Spasov

11 March 2012 18	Montana	0–3	Levski Sofia	Montana
14:30 (EET)		Report	Juninho 55'; Tsvetkov 63', 84'	Stadium: Ogosta; Attendance: 4,960; Referee: Hristo Ristoskov

18 March 2012 19	Botev Vratsa	0–2	Levski Sofia	Vratsa
15:30 (EET)		Report	Starokin 55'; Gadzhev 58'	Stadium: Hristo Botev; Attendance: 6,730; Referee: Martin Bogdev

25 March 2012 20	Levski Sofia	0–1	Minyor Pernik	Sofia
13:30 (EET)		Report	Vasilev 58'	Stadium: Georgi Asparuhov; Attendance: 3,830; Referee: Tasko Taskov

29 March 2012 21	Litex Lovech	1–0	Levski Sofia	Lovech
17:45 (EET)	Yanev 32'	Report		Stadium: Lovech Stadium; Attendance: 5,970; Referee: Stanislav Todorov

2 April 2012 22	Levski Sofia	0–1	Ludogorets	Sofia
21:00 (EET)		Report	Stoyanov 37'	Stadium: Georgi Asparuhov; Attendance: 10,000; Referee: Nikolay Yordanov

8 April 2012 23	Lokomotiv Sofia	1–1	Levski Sofia	Sofia
16:00 (EET)	Peev 32'	Report	Juninho 79'	Stadium: Slavia; Attendance: 1,000; Referee: Radan Miryanov

18 April 2012 24	Levski Sofia	2–2	Chernomorets Burgas	Sofia
21:00 (EET)	Calvo 28'; Yovov 55'	Report	Boli 21'; Chahechouhe 82'	Stadium: Georgi Asparuhov; Attendance: 2,000; Referee: Aleksandar Kostadinov

23 April 2012 25	Kaliakra Kavarna	1–4	Levski Sofia	Kavarna
19:00 (EET)	Zakov 15'	Report	Calvo 2' 77' (pen.); Yovov 54', 74'	Stadium: Kavarna Stadium; Attendance: 1,000; Referee: Stefan Spasov

29 April 2012 26	Levski Sofia	1–0	CSKA Sofia	Sofia
17:45 (EET)	Cristovão 49'	Report		Stadium: Vasil Levski; Attendance: 20,000; Referee: Nikolay Yordanov

6 May 2012 27	Lokomotiv Plovdiv	3–2	Levski Sofia	Plovdiv
17:45 (EET)	de Carvalho 29'; Todorov 40'; Zlatinski 62' (pen.)	Report	Yovov 14'; Raykov 18'	Stadium: Lokomotiv Stadium (Plovdiv); Attendance: 12,000; Referee: Tasko Taskov

11 May 2012 28	Levski Sofia	2–0	Beroe	Sofia
19:00 (EET)	Tsvetkov 34'; Juninho 90'	Report		Stadium: Georgi Asparuhov; Attendance: 1,500; Referee: Radoslav Stanev

19 May 2012 29	Vidima-Rakovski	1–6	Levski Sofia	Sevlievo
16:30 (EET)	Rusev 25' (pen.)	Report	Juninho 9', 11', 43'; Calvo 13'; Dimov 18'; Raykov 76'	Stadium: Rakovski Stadium; Attendance: 1,000; Referee: Nikola Popov

23 May 2012 30	Levski Sofia	7–0	Svetkavitsa	Sofia
16:00 (EET)	Gadzhev 18'; Calvo 41'; Tsvetkov 44', 74', 84'; Ramos 62'; Diamoutene 64'	Report		Stadium: Georgi Asparuhov; Attendance: 1,000; Referee: Radan Miryanov

=== Bulgarian Cup ===
23 November 2011 Second round	Bansko	0–1	Levski Sofia	Bansko
13:30 EEST		Report	Tsvetkov 32'	Stadium: St Petar Stadium; Attendance: 3,000; Referee: Ahmed Ahmed (Burgas)

3 December 2011 Third round	Etar 1924	0–3	Levski Sofia	Veliko Turnovo
EEST		Report	Tsvetkov 49', 90+3'; Dimov 78'	Stadium: Ivaylo Stadium; Attendance: 6,750

14 March 2012 Quarterfinal	Lokomotiv Plovdiv	2–1 (a.e.t.)	Levski Sofia	Plovdiv
EEST	Venkov 90+3'; Lazarov 92'	Report	Toni Calvo 21'	Stadium: Lokomotiv; Attendance: 6,340; Referee: Ivaylo Stoyanov

=== UEFA Europa League ===
==== Third qualifying round ====
28 July 2011 1st leg	Levski Sofia (Bulgaria)	2–1	(Slovakia) Spartak Trnava	Sofia, Bulgaria
19:45 CEST	Gadzhev 89'; Ars 90+2'	Report	Tomaček 80' (pen.)	Stadium: Georgi Asparuhov; Attendance: 11,900; Referee: Sergiy Boiko (Ukraine)

4 August 2011 2nd leg	Spartak Trnava (Slovakia)	2–1 (a.e.t.) (3−3 agg.) (5–4 p)	(Bulgaria) Levski Sofia	Trnava, Slovakia
19:00 CEST	Tomaček 52', 59' (pen.)	Report	Ars 11'	Stadium: Antona Malatinského; Attendance: 12,169; Referee: Ken Henry Johnsen (Norway)
	Penalties
	Karhan (penalty scored); Hanzel (penalty scored); Procházka (penalty scored); Tomaček (penalty scored); Kaščák (penalty scored)		(penalty missed) Yovov; (penalty scored) Ars; (penalty scored) Gadzhev; (penalty scored) Calvo; (penalty scored) Raykov
