= 2011–12 UEFA Europa League qualifying (third and play-off round matches) =

European football competition

This page summarises the matches of the third qualifying and play-off rounds of 2011–12 UEFA Europa League qualifying.

Times are CEST (UTC+2), as listed by UEFA (local times, if different, are in parentheses).

== Third qualifying round ==
=== Summary ===
The first legs were played on 26 and 28 July, and the second legs were played on 4 August 2011.

Team 1	Agg.	Team 2	1st leg	2nd leg
Atlético Madrid (Spain)	4–1	(Norway) Strømsgodset	2–1	2–0
Young Boys (Switzerland)	5–1	(Belgium) Westerlo	3–1	2–0
Ventspils (Latvia)	1–9	(Serbia) Red Star Belgrade	1–2	0–7
Alania Vladikavkaz (Russia)	2–2 (4–2 p)	(Kazakhstan) Aktobe	1–1	1–1 (a.e.t.)
AEK Larnaca (Cyprus)	5–2	(Czech Republic) Mladá Boleslav	3–0	2–2
Željezničar (Bosnia and Herzegovina)	0–8	(Israel) Maccabi Tel Aviv	0–2	0–6
AZ (Netherlands)	3–1	(Czech Republic) Jablonec	2–0	1–1
Olimpija Ljubljana (Slovenia)	3–4	Austria Wien	1–1	2–3
Bursaspor (Turkey)	5–2	(Belarus) Gomel	2–1	3–1
Aalesund (Norway)	5–1	(Sweden) IF Elfsborg	4–0	1–1
Gaziantepspor (Turkey)	0–1	(Poland) Legia Warsaw	0–1	0–0
Hapoel Tel Aviv (Israel)	5–2	(Liechtenstein) Vaduz	4–0	1–2
Metalurgi Rustavi (Georgia (country))	2–7	(France) Rennes	2–5	0–2
Levski Sofia (Bulgaria)	3–3 (4–5 p)	(Slovakia) Spartak Trnava	2–1	1–2 (a.e.t.)
Midtjylland (Denmark)	1–2	(Portugal) Vitória de Guimarães	0–0	1–2
Dinamo București (Romania)	4–3	(Croatia) Varaždin	2–2	2–1
Karpaty Lviv (Ukraine)	5–1	(Republic of Ireland) St Patrick's Athletic	2–0	3–1
Palermo (Italy)	3–3 (a) (Note: Order of legs reversed after original draw.)	(Switzerland) Thun	2–2	1–1
KR (Iceland)	1–6	(Georgia (country)) Dinamo Tbilisi	1–4	0–2
Omonia (Cyprus)	3–1	(Netherlands) ADO Den Haag	3–0	0–1
Red Bull Salzburg (Austria)	4–0	(Slovakia) Senica	1–0	3–0
Club Brugge (Belgium)	4–2	(Azerbaijan) Qarabağ	4–1	0–1
Differdange 03 (Luxembourg)	w/o (Note: Greek club Olympiacos Volos, who had reached the play-off round, were excluded from the competition by UEFA on 11 August 2011 for their involvement in the Koriopolis match-fixing scandal. UEFA decided to replace them in the play-off round with Differdange 03 from Luxembourg, who had lost to Olympiacos Volos in the previous round.)	(Greece) Olympiacos Volos	0–3	0–3
Mainz 05 (Germany)	2–2 (3–4 p)	(Romania) Gaz Metan Mediaș	1–1	1–1 (a.e.t.)
Bnei Yehuda (Israel)	1–3	(Sweden) Helsingborgs IF	1–0	0–3
Stoke City (England)	2–0	(Croatia) Hajduk Split	1–0	1–0
Anorthosis Famagusta (Cyprus)	2–3	(North Macedonia) Rabotnicki	0–2	2–1
Sparta Prague (Czech Republic)	7–0	(Bosnia and Herzegovina) Sarajevo	5–0	2–0
Vorskla Poltava (Ukraine)	2–0	(Republic of Ireland) Sligo Rovers	0–0	2–0
Paks (Hungary)	2–5	(Scotland) Heart of Midlothian	1–1	1–4
Śląsk Wrocław (Poland)	0–0 (4–3 p)	(Bulgaria) Lokomotiv Sofia	0–0	0–0 (a.e.t.)
Nacional (Portugal)	4–2	(Sweden) BK Häcken	3–0	1–2
Ried (Austria)	4–4 (a)	(Denmark) Brøndby	2–0	2–4
Vålerenga (Norway)	0–5	(Greece) PAOK	0–2	0–3
RNK Split (Croatia)	0–2	(England) Fulham	0–0	0–2

=== Matches ===
28 July 2011
21:00

Atlético Madrid (Spain)	2–1	(Norway) Strømsgodset
Reyes 54', 74'	Report	Storflor 80'

Vicente Calderón, Madrid
Attendance: 30,056
Referee: Danny Desmond Makkelie (Netherlands)
4 August 2011
18:30

Strømsgodset (Norway)	0–2	(Spain) Atlético Madrid
	Report	Adrián 13'; Reyes 90+3'

Marienlyst Stadion, Drammen
Attendance: 5,807
Referee: Mark Courtney (Northern Ireland)

Atlético Madrid won 4–1 on aggregate.

28 July 2011
19:30

Young Boys (Switzerland)	3–1	(Belgium) Westerlo
Farnerud 22'; Degen 33', 79'	Report	Brüls 34'

Stade de Suisse, Bern
Attendance: 11,163
Referee: Paolo Silvio Mazzoleni (Italy)
4 August 2011
20:00

Westerlo (Belgium)	0–2	(Switzerland) Young Boys
	Report	Schneuwly 5'; Bienvenu 77'

Het Kuipje, Westerlo
Attendance: 2,386
Referee: Richard Trutz (Slovakia)

Young Boys won 5–1 on aggregate.

28 July 2011
18:00

Ventspils (Latvia)	1–2	(Serbia) Red Star Belgrade
Višņakovs 44'	Report	Kaluđerović 10'; Mezenga 90+3'

Ventspils Olimpiskais Stadions, Ventspils
Attendance: 3,000
Referee: Lars Christoffersen (Denmark)
4 August 2011
20:30

Red Star Belgrade (Serbia)	7–0	(Latvia) Ventspils
Martínez 13' (o.g.); Kaluđerović 23', 53'; Lazović 26'; Borja 41', 75'; Mezenga 60'	Report

Stadion Crvena Zvezda, Belgrade
Attendance: 39,628
Referee: Ruddy Buquet (France)

Red Star Belgrade won 9–1 on aggregate.

28 July 2011
18:00

Alania Vladikavkaz (Russia)	1–1	(Kazakhstan) Aktobe
Buraev 60'	Report	Mane 11'

Republican Spartak Stadium, Vladikavkaz
Attendance: 23,000
Referee: Ivan Kružliak (Slovakia)
4 August 2011
18:00

Aktobe (Kazakhstan)	1–1 (a.e.t.)	(Russia) Alania Vladikavkaz
Đilas 75'	Report	Bikmaev 55'
Penalties
Khairullin (penalty scored); Kenzhesariev (penalty scored); Mane (penalty missed); Đilas (penalty missed)	2–4	(penalty scored) Gabulov; (penalty scored) Bikmaev; (penalty scored) Gigolayev; (penalty scored) Neco

Aktobe Central Stadium, Aktobe
Attendance: 12,700
Referee: Simon Lee Evans (Wales)

2–2 on aggregate; Alania Vladikavkaz won 4–2 on penalties.

28 July 2011
17:00

AEK Larnaca (Cyprus)	3–0	(Czech Republic) Mladá Boleslav
van Dijk 62' (pen.); García 73'; de Cler 90+3'	Report

Neo GSZ Stadium, Larnaca
Attendance: 1,977
Referee: Sébastien Delferiere (Belgium)
4 August 2011
17:00

Mladá Boleslav (Czech Republic)	2–2	(Cyprus) AEK Larnaca
Řezníček 52' (pen.); Štohanzl 74'	Report	Priso 44'; Mrdaković 76' (pen.)

Městský stadion, Mladá Boleslav
Attendance: 2,312
Referee: Peter Rasmussen (Denmark)

AEK Larnaca won 5–2 on aggregate.

28 July 2011
20:30

Željezničar (Bosnia and Herzegovina)	0–2	(Israel) Maccabi Tel Aviv
	Report	Colautti 47', 56'

Asim Ferhatović Hase Stadium, Sarajevo (Note: Željezničar played their home match at Asim Ferhatović Hase Stadium, Sarajevo as it has a greater capacity than their own Stadion Grbavica.)
Attendance: 10,000
Referee: Michael Lerjeus (Sweden)
4 August 2011
19:30

Maccabi Tel Aviv (Israel)	6–0	(Bosnia and Herzegovina) Željezničar
Colautti 18', 45+1'; Dahan 38'; Atar 54', 86'; Vasilić 81' (o.g.)	Report

Bloomfield Stadium, Tel Aviv
Attendance: 6,013
Referee: Alan Black (Northern Ireland)

Maccabi Tel Aviv won 8–0 on aggregate.

28 July 2011
20:00

AZ (Netherlands)	2–0	(Czech Republic) Jablonec
Wernbloom 64'; Guðmundsson 88'	Report

AFAS Stadion, Alkmaar
Attendance: 8,871
Referee: Szymon Marciniak (Poland)
4 August 2011
20:30

Jablonec (Czech Republic)	1–1	(Netherlands) AZ
Loučka 80'	Report	Benschop 45'

Stadion Střelnice, Jablonec nad Nisou
Attendance: 4,844
Referee: Viktor Shvetsov (Ukraine)

AZ won 3–1 on aggregate.

28 July 2011
19:00

Olimpija Ljubljana (Slovenia)	1–1	Austria Wien
Vršič 60'	Report	Linz 33'

Stožice Stadium, Ljubljana
Attendance: 7,350
Referee: Stanislav Todorov (Bulgaria)
4 August 2011
21:05

Austria Wien	3–2	(Slovenia) Olimpija Ljubljana
Barazite 18', 46', 69' (pen.)	Report	Vršič 54'; Jović 59'

Franz Horr Stadium, Vienna
Attendance: 7,568
Referee: Aleksei Eskov (Russia)

Austria Wien won 4–3 on aggregate.

28 July 2011
19:30

Bursaspor (Turkey)	2–1	(Belarus) Gomel
Aziz 52'; Kaş 72'	Report	Kuzmyanok 42'

Bursa Atatürk Stadium, Bursa
Attendance: 16,122
Referee: Alain Bieri (Switzerland)
4 August 2011
19:00

Gomel (Belarus)	1–3	(Turkey) Bursaspor
Aleksiyevich 41'	Report	N'Diaye 78'; Insúa 85'; Bahadır 90+1'

Central Stadium, Gomel
Attendance: 13,100
Referee: Marius Avram (Romania)

Bursaspor won 5–2 on aggregate.

28 July 2011
19:00

Aalesund (Norway)	4–0	(Sweden) IF Elfsborg
Okoronkwo 5'; Barrantes 56'; Orry Larsen 72'; Augustsson 74' (o.g.)	Report

Color Line Stadium, Ålesund
Attendance: 5,769
Referee: Boško Jovanetić (Serbia)
4 August 2011
18:00

IF Elfsborg (Sweden)	1–1	(Norway) Aalesund
Ericsson 65'	Report	Ulvestad 49' (pen.)

Borås Arena, Borås
Attendance: 2,685
Referee: Radek Matějek (Czech Republic)

Aalesund won 5–1 on aggregate.

28 July 2011
20:00

Gaziantepspor (Turkey)	0–1	(Poland) Legia Warsaw
	Report	Radović 51'

Gaziantep Kamil Ocak Stadium, Gaziantep
Attendance: 7,852
Referee: César Muñiz Fernández (Spain)
4 August 2011
19:00

Legia Warsaw (Poland)	0–0	(Turkey) Gaziantepspor
	Report

Pepsi Arena, Warsaw
Attendance: 20,118
Referee: Darko Čeferin (Slovenia)

Legia Warsaw won 1–0 on aggregate.

28 July 2011
19:30

Hapoel Tel Aviv (Israel)	4–0	(Liechtenstein) Vaduz
Kende 24'; Tamuz 45+1'; Damari 49'; Cohen 82'	Report

Bloomfield Stadium, Tel Aviv
Attendance: 8,822
Referee: Lorenc Jemini (Albania)
4 August 2011
20:00

Vaduz (Liechtenstein)	2–1	(Israel) Hapoel Tel Aviv
Zanni 78'; Rafinha 81'	Report	Damari 1'

Rheinpark Stadion, Vaduz
Attendance: 870
Referee: Daniel Stålhammar (Sweden)

Hapoel Tel Aviv won 5–2 on aggregate.

28 July 2011
19:00

Metalurgi Rustavi (Georgia (country))	2–5	(France) Rennes
Japaridze 41'; Razmadze 56' (pen.)	Report	Boukari 17', 31'; Pitroipa 42', 70'; Féret 49'

Boris Paichadze National Stadium, Tbilisi (Note: Metalurgi Rustavi played their home match at Boris Paichadze National Stadium, Tbilisi as it has a greater capacity than their own Poladi Stadium.)
Attendance: 10,312
Referee: Marios Panayi (Cyprus)
4 August 2011
19:00

Rennes (France)	2–0	(Georgia (country)) Metalurgi Rustavi
Montaño 75'; Féret 85'	Report

Stade de la Route de Lorient, Rennes
Attendance: 13,848
Referee: Antti Munukka (Finland)

Rennes won 7–2 on aggregate.

28 July 2011
19:45

Levski Sofia (Bulgaria)	2–1	(Slovakia) Spartak Trnava
Gadzhev 89'; Ars 90+2'	Report	Tomaček 80' (pen.)

Georgi Asparuhov, Sofia
Attendance: 11,900
Referee: Serhiy Boyko (Ukraine)
4 August 2011
19:00

Spartak Trnava (Slovakia)	2–1 (a.e.t.)	(Bulgaria) Levski Sofia
Tomaček 52', 59' (pen.)	Report	Ars 11'
Penalties
Karhan (penalty scored); Hanzel (penalty scored); Procházka (penalty scored); Tomaček (penalty scored); Kaščák (penalty scored)	5–4	(penalty missed) Yovov; (penalty scored) Ars; (penalty scored) Gadzhev; (penalty scored) Calvo; (penalty scored) Raykov

Štadión Antona Malatinského, Trnava
Attendance: 12,159
Referee: Ken Henry Johnsen (Norway)

3–3 on aggregate; Spartak Trnava won 5–4 on penalties.

28 July 2011
21:00

Midtjylland (Denmark)	0–0	(Portugal) Vitória de Guimarães
	Report

MCH Arena, Herning
Attendance: 4,579
Referee: Menashe Masiah (Israel)
4 August 2011
21:15

Vitória de Guimarães (Portugal)	2–1	(Denmark) Midtjylland
Faouzi 45'; Targino 76'	Report	Nielsen 28'

Estádio D. Afonso Henriques, Guimarães
Attendance: 9,052
Referee: Richard Liesveld (Netherlands)

Vitória de Guimarães won 2–1 on aggregate.

28 July 2011
20:00

Dinamo București (Romania)	2–2	(Croatia) Varaždin
Sušac 6' (o.g.); Moți 16'	Report	Sačer 43'; Vugrinec 45+2'

Stadionul Dinamo, Bucharest
Attendance: 4,380
Referee: Leontios Trattou (Cyprus)
4 August 2011
17:00

Varaždin (Croatia)	1–2	(Romania) Dinamo București
Golubar 14'	Report	Dănciulescu 7'; Munteanu 26'

Stadion Varteks, Varaždin
Attendance: 2,500
Referee: Ján Valášek (Slovakia)

Dinamo București won 4–3 on aggregate.

28 July 2011
18:30

Karpaty Lviv (Ukraine)	2–0	(Republic of Ireland) St Patrick's Athletic
Fedetskyi 34'; Varankow 90+3'	Report

Ukraina Stadium, Lviv
Attendance: 13,000
Referee: Martin Strömbergsson (Sweden)
4 August 2011
20:45

St Patrick's Athletic (Republic of Ireland)	1–3	(Ukraine) Karpaty Lviv
McMillan 57'	Report	Zenjov 22'; Khudobyak 64'; Oshchypko 83'

Tallaght Stadium, Tallaght (Note: St Patrick's Athletic played their home match at Tallaght Stadium, Tallaght, as it has a greater capacity than their own Richmond Park.)
Attendance: 2,109
Referee: Ovidiu Alin Hațegan (Romania)

Karpaty Lviv won 5–1 on aggregate.

28 July 2011
20:45

Palermo (Italy)	2–2	(Switzerland) Thun
Iličić 13'; Miccoli 90+2'	Report	Lüthi 6'; Schneider 56'

Stadio Renzo Barbera, Palermo
Attendance: 28,760
Referee: Milorad Mažić (Serbia)
4 August 2011
19:30

Thun (Switzerland)	1–1	(Italy) Palermo
Lezcano 65'	Report	González 49'

Stadion Lachen, Thun
Attendance: 7,227
Referee: Liran Liany (Israel)

3–3 on aggregate; Thun won on away goals.

28 July 2011
21:15

KR (Iceland)	1–4	(Georgia (country)) Dinamo Tbilisi
Baldvinsson 2'	Report	Kakhelishvili 38'; Yagüe 50'; Xisco 61' (pen.); Lekvtadze 67'

KR-völlur, Reykjavík
Attendance: 1,200
Referee: Kenn Hansen (Denmark)
4 August 2011
19:00

Dinamo Tbilisi (Georgia (country))	2–0	(Iceland) KR
Yagüe 48'; Kakhelishvili 55'	Report

Boris Paichadze National Stadium, Tbilisi
Attendance: 12,000
Referee: Pawel Gil (Poland)

Dinamo Tbilisi won 6–1 on aggregate.

28 July 2011
19:30

Omonia (Cyprus)	3–0	(Netherlands) ADO Den Haag
Alex 37' (pen.); Rengifo 58'; Christofi 77'	Report

GSP Stadium, Nicosia
Attendance: 12,326
Referee: Carlos Xistra (Portugal)
4 August 2011
20:00

ADO Den Haag (Netherlands)	1–0	(Cyprus) Omonia
Derijck 53'	Report

Kyocera Stadion, The Hague
Attendance: 13,268
Referee: Marco Borg (Malta)

Omonia won 3–1 on aggregate.

28 July 2011
19:00

Red Bull Salzburg (Austria)	1–0	(Slovakia) Senica
Leonardo 75'	Report

Red Bull Arena, Salzburg
Attendance: 5,900
Referee: Aleksei Kulbakov (Belarus)
4 August 2011
19:00

Senica (Slovakia)	0–3	(Austria) Red Bull Salzburg
	Report	Leonardo 10'; Alan 57', 64'

Stadion FK Senica, Senica
Attendance: 3,273
Referee: Hannes Kaasik (Estonia)

Red Bull Salzburg won 4–0 on aggregate.

28 July 2011
20:30

Club Brugge (Belgium)	4–1	(Azerbaijan) Qarabağ
Vleminckx 9'; Vázquez 55'; Donk 71'; Dirar 83'	Report	Aliyev 62'

Jan Breydel Stadium, Bruges
Attendance: 22,213
Referee: Arnold Hunter (Northern Ireland)
4 August 2011
18:00

Qarabağ (Azerbaijan)	1–0	(Belgium) Club Brugge
Soltanov 87'	Report

Tofiq Bahramov Stadium, Baku (Note: Qarabağ played their home match at Tofiq Bahramov Stadium, Baku as their own Guzanli Olympic Complex Stadium did not meet the UEFA criteria.)
Attendance: 9,800
Referee: Sascha Kever (Switzerland)

Club Brugge won 4–2 on aggregate.

28 July 2011
20:00

Differdange 03 (Luxembourg)	0–3	(Greece) Olympiacos Volos
	Report	Schembri 66'; Acosta 71'; Solakis 89'

Stade Josy Barthel, Luxembourg City (Note: Differdange 03 played their home match at Stade Josy Barthel, Luxembourg City as their own Stade du Thillenberg did not meet the UEFA criteria.)
Attendance: 743
Referee: David Mckeon (Republic of Ireland)
4 August 2011
20:00

Olympiacos Volos (Greece)	3–0	(Luxembourg) Differdange 03
Martín 30'; Szélesi 58'; Solakis 83'	Report

Panthessaliko Stadium, Volos
Attendance: 4,267
Referee: Arman Amirkhanyan (Armenia)

Differdange 03 won on walkover as Olympiacos Volos were disqualified. (Note: Greek club Olympiacos Volos, who had reached the play-off round, were excluded from the competition by UEFA on 11 August 2011 for their involvement in the Koriopolis match-fixing scandal. UEFA decided to replace them in the play-off round with Differdange 03 from Luxembourg, who had lost to Olympiakos Volou in the previous round.)

28 July 2011
20:30

Mainz 05 (Germany)	1–1	(Romania) Gaz Metan Mediaș
Bungert 31'	Report	Bawab 60'

Coface Arena, Mainz
Attendance: 15,759
Referee: Steven McLean (Scotland)
4 August 2011
19:00

Gaz Metan Mediaș (Romania)	1–1 (a.e.t.)	(Germany) Mainz 05
Bawab 62'	Report	Risse 31'
Penalties
Lazăr (penalty scored); Buzean (penalty scored); Petre (penalty scored); Lițu (penalty missed); Bawab (penalty scored)	4–3	(penalty scored) Polanski; (penalty scored) Slišković; (penalty scored) Risse; (penalty missed) Allagui; (penalty missed) Soto

Stadionul Gaz Metan, Mediaș
Attendance: 5,500
Referee: Tamás Bognár (Hungary)

2–2 on aggregate; Gaz Metan Mediaș won 4–3 on penalties.

26 July 2011
18:00

Bnei Yehuda (Israel)	1–0	(Sweden) Helsingborgs IF
Galván 41'	Report

Bloomfield Stadium, Tel Aviv
Attendance: 2,223
Referee: Mihaly Fabian (Hungary)
4 August 2011
19:00

Helsingborgs IF (Sweden)	3–0	(Israel) Bnei Yehuda
Lindström 3', 73'; Gashi 61'	Report

Olympia, Helsingborg
Attendance: 5,002
Referee: Jérome Efong Nzolo (Belgium)

Helsingborgs IF won 3–1 on aggregate.

28 July 2011
20:45

Stoke City (England)	1–0	(Croatia) Hajduk Split
Walters 3'	Report

Britannia Stadium, Stoke-on-Trent
Attendance: 26,322
Referee: Babak Rafati (Germany)
4 August 2011
19:00

Hajduk Split (Croatia)	0–1	(England) Stoke City
	Report	Miličević 90+1' (o.g.)

Stadion Poljud, Split
Attendance: 33,000
Referee: Andrea De Marco (Italy)

Stoke City won 2–0 on aggregate.

28 July 2011
19:00

Anorthosis Famagusta (Cyprus)	0–2	(North Macedonia) Rabotnicki
	Report	Petrović 71'; Velkovski 82'

Antonis Papadopoulos Stadium, Larnaca
Attendance: 6,500
Referee: Harald Lechner (Austria)
4 August 2011
20:00

Rabotnicki (North Macedonia)	1–2	(Cyprus) Anorthosis Famagusta
Kumbev 87'	Report	Rezek 50'; Cristóvão 65'

Philip II Arena, Skopje
Attendance: 10,000
Referee: Nikolay Yordanov (Bulgaria)

Rabotnicki won 3–2 on aggregate.

28 July 2011
19:00

Sparta Prague (Czech Republic)	5–0	(Bosnia and Herzegovina) Sarajevo
Kweuke 5', 69', 90+3'; Sionko 36'; Podaný 90+1'	Report

Generali Arena, Prague
Attendance: 11,626
Referee: Alexandru Deaconu (Romania)
4 August 2011
21:00

Sarajevo (Bosnia and Herzegovina)	0–2	(Czech Republic) Sparta Prague
	Report	Kweuke 20'; Matějovský 36'

Asim Ferhatović Hase Stadium, Sarajevo
Attendance: 5,500
Referee: Maksim Layushkin (Russia)

Sparta Prague won 7–0 on aggregate.

28 July 2011
19:00

Vorskla Poltava (Ukraine)	0–0	(Republic of Ireland) Sligo Rovers
	Report

Butovsky Vorskla Stadium, Poltava
Attendance: 8,500
Referee: Gediminas Mažeika (Lithuania)
4 August 2011
18:45

Sligo Rovers (Republic of Ireland)	0–2	(Ukraine) Vorskla Poltava
	Report	Zakarlyuka 16'; Rebenok 17'

Showgrounds, Sligo Town
Attendance: 3,600
Referee: Emir Alecković (Bosnia and Herzegovina)

Vorskla Poltava won 2–0 on aggregate.

28 July 2011
20:00

Paks (Hungary)	1–1	(Scotland) Heart of Midlothian
Sipeki 32'	Report	Hamill 45+2' (pen.)

Stadion Sóstói, Székesfehérvár (Note: Paks played their home match at Stadion Sóstói, Székesfehérvár as their own Stadion PSE did not meet the UEFA criteria.)
Attendance: 3,500
Referee: Mattias Gestranius (Finland)
4 August 2011
20:45

Heart of Midlothian (Scotland)	4–1	(Hungary) Paks
Stevenson 34', 45+1'; Driver 50'; Skácel 76'	Report	Böde 89'

Tynecastle Stadium, Edinburgh
Attendance: 12,611
Referee: Robert Malek (Poland)

Heart of Midlothian won 5–2 on aggregate.

28 July 2011
16:45

Śląsk Wrocław (Poland)	0–0	(Bulgaria) Lokomotiv Sofia
	Report

Stadion Oporowska, Wrocław
Attendance: 7,000
Referee: Mauro Bergonzi (Italy)
4 August 2011
19:30

Lokomotiv Sofia (Bulgaria)	0–0 (a.e.t.)	(Poland) Śląsk Wrocław
	Report
Penalties
Goranov (penalty scored); Yordanov (penalty scored); Ivanov (penalty missed); Dobrev (penalty scored); Dafchev (penalty missed)	3–4	(penalty scored) Sztylka; (penalty scored) Mila; (penalty scored) Madej; (penalty scored) Pietrasiak

Vasil Levski National Stadium, Sofia (Note: Lokomotiv Sofia played their home match at Vasil Levski National Stadium, Sofia as their own Lokomotiv Stadium did not meet the UEFA criteria.)
Attendance: 2,610
Referee: Oliver Drachta (Austria)

0–0 on aggregate; Śląsk Wrocław won 4–3 on penalties.

28 July 2011
20:45

Nacional (Portugal)	3–0	(Sweden) BK Häcken
Luís Alberto 13'; Mateus 18', 45'	Report

Estádio da Madeira, Funchal
Attendance: 4,612
Referee: Sándor Andó-Szabó (Hungary)
4 August 2011
19:00

BK Häcken (Sweden)	2–1	(Portugal) Nacional
Makondele 28', 87'	Report	Rondón 40'

Ullevi, Gothenburg (Note: BK Häcken played their home match at Ullevi, Gothenburg as their own Rambergsvallen did not meet the UEFA criteria.)
Attendance: 808
Referee: Cyril Zimmermann (Switzerland)

Nacional won 4–2 on aggregate.

28 July 2011
21:05

Ried (Austria)	2–0	(Denmark) Brøndby
Mader 32'; Royer 46'	Report

Keine Sorgen Arena, Ried im Innkreis
Attendance: 4,500
Referee: Antonio Damato (Italy)
4 August 2011
19:00

Brøndby (Denmark)	4–2	(Austria) Ried
Kristiansen 40'; Krohn-Dehli 45' (pen.); Akharraz 53', 55'	Report	Royer 71'; Hadžić 88'

Brøndby Stadium, Brøndbyvester
Attendance: 7,759
Referee: Thorsten Kinhöfer (Germany)

4–4 on aggregate; Ried won on away goals.

28 July 2011
19:00

Vålerenga (Norway)	0–2	(Greece) PAOK
	Report	Vieirinha 72'; García 90'

Ullevaal Stadion, Oslo
Attendance: 3,019
Referee: Ante Vučemilović-Šimunović Jr. (Croatia)
4 August 2011
20:00

PAOK (Greece)	3–0	(Norway) Vålerenga
Vieirinha 45'; Athanasiadis 49'; Fotakis 58'	Report

Toumba Stadium, Thessaloniki
Attendance: 22,156
Referee: Kristo Tohver (Estonia)

PAOK won 5–0 on aggregate.

28 July 2011
19:30

RNK Split (Croatia)	0–0	(England) Fulham
	Report

Stadion Hrvatski vitezovi, Dugopolje (Note: RNK Split played their home match at Stadion Hrvatski vitezovi, Dugopolje as their own Stadion Park mladeži did not meet the UEFA criteria.)
Attendance: 4,000
Referee: Sergei Karasev (Russia)
4 August 2011
20:30

Fulham (England)	2–0	(Croatia) RNK Split
Johnson 19'; Murphy 56' (pen.)	Report

Craven Cottage, London
Attendance: 17,087
Referee: Duarte Gomes (Portugal)

Fulham won 2–0 on aggregate.

== Play-off round ==
=== Summary ===
The first legs were played on 18 August, and the second legs were played on 25 August 2011.

Team 1	Agg.	Team 2	1st leg	2nd leg
Maccabi Tel Aviv (Israel)	4–2	(Greece) Panathinaikos	3–0	1–2
Atlético Madrid (Spain)	6–0	(Portugal) Vitória de Guimarães	2–0	4–0
Shamrock Rovers (Republic of Ireland)	3–2	(Serbia) Partizan	1–1	2–1 (a.e.t.)
Metalist Kharkiv (Ukraine)	4–0	(France) Sochaux	0–0	4–0
Beşiktaş (Turkey)	3–2	(Russia) Alania Vladikavkaz	3–0	0–2
Rosenborg (Norway)	1–2	(Cyprus) AEK Larnaca	0–0	1–2
Vorskla Poltava (Ukraine)	5–3	(Romania) Dinamo București	2–1	3–2
Bursaspor (Turkey)	3–4	(Belgium) Anderlecht	1–2	2–2
Slovan Bratislava (Slovakia)	2–1 (Note: Order of legs reversed after original draw.)	(Italy) Roma	1–0	1–1
Differdange 03 (Luxembourg)	0–6	(France) Paris Saint-Germain	0–4	0–2
Legia Warsaw (Poland)	5–4	(Russia) Spartak Moscow	2–2	3–2
Ekranas (Lithuania)	1–4	(Israel) Hapoel Tel Aviv	1–0	0–4
PAOK (Greece)	3–1	(Ukraine) Karpaty Lviv	2–0	1–1
Athletic Bilbao (Spain)	w/o (Note: Order of legs reversed after original draw. Also, as a result of match-fixing allegations, Turkish club Fenerbahçe were removed from the 2011–12 UEFA Champions League and were replaced with Trabzonspor on 24 August 2011. As a result, Trabzonspor's second leg against Athletic Bilbao was cancelled, and Athletic Bilbao qualified for the group stage.)	(Turkey) Trabzonspor	0–0	Canc.
Heart of Midlothian (Scotland)	0–5	(England) Tottenham Hotspur	0–5	0–0
Maribor (Slovenia)	3–2	(Scotland) Rangers	2–1	1–1
Steaua București (Romania)	3–1	(Bulgaria) CSKA Sofia	2–0	1–1
Nordsjælland (Denmark)	1–2	(Portugal) Sporting CP	0–0	1–2
Fulham (England)	3–1	(Ukraine) Dnipro Dnipropetrovsk	3–0	0–1
Lokomotiv Moscow (Russia)	3–1	(Slovakia) Spartak Trnava	2–0	1–1
Celtic (Scotland)	6–0 (Note: Order of legs reversed after original draw. Also, Celtic lodged protests over the eligibility of a number of the Sion players who participated in the two legs of the play-off round, which Sion won 3–1 aggregate (first leg: 0–0; second leg: 3–1). The UEFA Control and Disciplinary Body accepted the protests and decided to award both matches to Celtic by forfeit (3–0). As a consequence, Celtic qualified for the UEFA Europa League group stage.)	(Switzerland) Sion	3–0	3–0
Śląsk Wrocław (Poland)	2–4	(Romania) Rapid București	1–3	1–1
Litex Lovech (Bulgaria)	1–3	(Ukraine) Dynamo Kyiv	1–2	0–1
Lazio (Italy)	9–1	(North Macedonia) Rabotnicki	6–0	3–1
Nacional (Portugal)	0–3	(England) Birmingham City	0–0	0–3
Ried (Austria)	0–5	(Netherlands) PSV Eindhoven	0–0	0–5
Thun (Switzerland)	1–5	(England) Stoke City	0–1	1–4
Aalesund (Norway)	2–7	(Netherlands) AZ	2–1	0–6
Vaslui (Romania)	2–1	(Czech Republic) Sparta Prague	2–0	0–1
Omonia (Cyprus)	2–2 (a)	(Austria) Red Bull Salzburg	2–1	0–1
Zestaponi (Georgia (country))	3–5	(Belgium) Club Brugge	3–3	0–2
Hannover 96 (Germany)	3–2	(Spain) Sevilla	2–1	1–1
HJK (Finland)	3–6	(Germany) Schalke 04	2–0	1–6
AEK Athens (Greece)	2–1	(Georgia (country)) Dinamo Tbilisi	1–0	1–1 (a.e.t.)
Red Star Belgrade (Serbia)	1–6	(France) Rennes	1–2	0–4
Austria Wien	3–2	(Romania) Gaz Metan Mediaș	3–1	0–1
Braga (Portugal)	2–2 (a)	(Switzerland) Young Boys	0–0	2–2
Standard Liège (Belgium)	4–1	(Sweden) Helsingborgs IF	1–0	3–1

=== Matches ===
18 August 2011
19:30

Maccabi Tel Aviv (Israel)	3–0	(Greece) Panathinaikos
Konaté 60'; Atar 67' (pen.), 90'	Report

Bloomfield Stadium, Tel Aviv
Attendance: 12,500
Referee: Eric Braamhaar (Netherlands)
25 August 2011
20:15

Panathinaikos (Greece)	2–1	(Israel) Maccabi Tel Aviv
Boumsong 70'; Toché 79'	Report	Medunjanin 61'

Olympic Stadium, Athens
Attendance: 15,503
Referee: Antonio Damato (Italy)

Maccabi Tel Aviv won 4–2 on aggregate.

18 August 2011
22:00

Atlético Madrid (Spain)	2–0	(Portugal) Vitória de Guimarães
Elias 68', 73'	Report

Vicente Calderón, Madrid
Attendance: 27,153
Referee: Clément Turpin (France)
25 August 2011
20:30

Vitória de Guimarães (Portugal)	0–4	(Spain) Atlético Madrid
	Report	Gabi 2' (pen.); Adrián 18', 60'; Salvio 81'

Estádio D. Afonso Henriques, Guimarães
Attendance: 10,330
Referee: Andre Marriner (England)

Atlético Madrid won 6–0 on aggregate.

18 August 2011
20:45

Shamrock Rovers (Republic of Ireland)	1–1	(Serbia) Partizan
McCabe 81'	Report	Tomić 14'

Tallaght Stadium, Tallaght
Attendance: 4,650
Referee: Hannes Kaasik (Estonia)
25 August 2011
20:30

Partizan (Serbia)	1–2 (a.e.t.)	(Republic of Ireland) Shamrock Rovers
Volkov 35'	Report	Sullivan 59'; O'Donnell 113' (pen.)

Stadion FK Partizan, Belgrade
Attendance: 13,706
Referee: Ján Valášek (Slovakia)

Shamrock Rovers won 3–2 on aggregate.

18 August 2011
20:30

Metalist Kharkiv (Ukraine)	0–0	(France) Sochaux
	Report

Metalist Stadium, Kharkiv
Attendance: 35,886
Referee: Stefan Johannesson (Sweden)
25 August 2011
20:45

Sochaux (France)	0–4	(Ukraine) Metalist Kharkiv
	Report	Sosa 6'; Cristaldo 11', 40'; Taison 51'

Stade Auguste Bonal, Montbéliard
Attendance: 8,739
Referee: Eduardo Iturralde González (Spain)

Metalist Kharkiv won 4–0 on aggregate.

18 August 2011
20:00

Beşiktaş (Turkey)	3–0	(Russia) Alania Vladikavkaz
Sivok 20'; Guti 76' (pen.); Almeida 89'	Report

BJK İnönü Stadium, Istanbul
Attendance: 18,430
Referee: Stanislav Todorov (Bulgaria)
25 August 2011
19:00

Alania Vladikavkaz (Russia)	2–0	(Turkey) Beşiktaş
Gabulov 81'; Neco 88'	Report

Republican Spartak Stadium, Vladikavkaz
Attendance: 10,000
Referee: Alexandru Dan Tudor (Romania)

Beşiktaş won 3–2 on aggregate.

18 August 2011
20:45

Rosenborg (Norway)	0–0	(Cyprus) AEK Larnaca
	Report

Lerkendal Stadion, Trondheim
Attendance: 5,081
Referee: Cristian Balaj (Romania)
25 August 2011
19:00

AEK Larnaca (Cyprus)	2–1	(Norway) Rosenborg
Van Dijk 21' (pen.), 53' (pen.)	Report	Henriksen 67'

Antonis Papadopoulos Stadium, Larnaca
Attendance: 5,342
Referee: Euan Norris (Scotland)

AEK Larnaca won 2–1 on aggregate.

18 August 2011
19:00

Vorskla Poltava (Ukraine)	2–1	(Romania) Dinamo București
Kryvosheyenko 32'; Rebenok 89'	Report	Niculae 58'

Butovsky Vorskla Stadium, Poltava
Attendance: 9,500
Referee: Liran Liany (Israel)
25 August 2011
17:00

Dinamo București (Romania)	2–3	(Ukraine) Vorskla Poltava
Torje 45'; Țucudean 90'	Report	Januzi 37'; Barannik 72', 78'

Stadionul Dinamo, Bucharest
Attendance: 9,641
Referee: Cyril Zimmermann (Switzerland)

Vorskla Poltava won 5–3 on aggregate.

18 August 2011
20:00

Bursaspor (Turkey)	1–2	(Belgium) Anderlecht
Vederson 36' (pen.)	Report	Legear 53' (pen.); Jovanović 77'

Bursa Atatürk Stadium, Bursa
Attendance: 21,920
Referee: Libor Kovařík (Czech Republic)
25 August 2011
20:30

Anderlecht (Belgium)	2–2	(Turkey) Bursaspor
Juhász 38'; Jovanović 57'	Report	Bahadır 5'; Stepanov 68'

Constant Vanden Stock Stadium, Brussels
Attendance: 15,551
Referee: Jorge Sousa (Portugal)

Anderlecht won 4–3 on aggregate.

18 August 2011
20:45

Slovan Bratislava (Slovakia)	1–0	(Italy) Roma
Dobrotka 80'	Report

Štadión Pasienky, Bratislava
Attendance: 10,548
Referee: Antonio Mateu Lahoz (Spain)
25 August 2011
20:45

Roma (Italy)	1–1	(Slovakia) Slovan Bratislava
Perrotta 11'	Report	Štepanovský 82'

Stadio Olimpico, Rome
Attendance: 47,302
Referee: Halis Özkahya (Turkey)

Slovan Bratislava won 2–1 on aggregate.

18 August 2011
20:45

Differdange 03 (Luxembourg)	0–4	(France) Paris Saint-Germain
	Report	Gameiro 17'; Bahebeck 71'; Ceará 90'; Ménez 90+1'

Stade Josy Barthel, Luxembourg City
Attendance: 6,153
Referee: Matej Jug (Slovenia)
25 August 2011
21:00

Paris Saint-Germain (France)	2–0	(Luxembourg) Differdange 03
Nenê 65'; Afoun 79' (o.g.)	Report

Parc des Princes, Paris
Attendance: 15,194
Referee: Kristinn Jakobsson (Iceland)

Paris Saint-Germain won 6–0 on aggregate.

18 August 2011
18:00

Legia Warsaw (Poland)	2–2	(Russia) Spartak Moscow
Radović 3', 69'	Report	Ari 52', 71'

Pepsi Arena, Warsaw
Attendance: 23,450
Referee: Mike Dean (England)
25 August 2011
17:00

Spartak Moscow (Russia)	2–3	(Poland) Legia Warsaw
K. Kombarov 10'; D. Kombarov 27' (pen.)	Report	Kucharczyk 29'; Rybus 43'; Gol 90+2'

Luzhniki Stadium, Moscow
Attendance: 19,345
Referee: Alon Yefet (Israel)

Legia Warsaw won 5–4 on aggregate.

18 August 2011
18:00

Ekranas (Lithuania)	1–0	(Israel) Hapoel Tel Aviv
Samusiovas 82'	Report

Aukštaitija Stadium, Panevėžys
Attendance: 2,748
Referee: Sascha Kever (Switzerland)
25 August 2011
19:30

Hapoel Tel Aviv (Israel)	4–0	(Lithuania) Ekranas
Cohen 37'; Damari 53'; Tamuz 81'; Lala 90+1'	Report

Bloomfield Stadium, Tel Aviv
Attendance: 7,500
Referee: Artyom Kuchin (Kazakhstan)

Hapoel Tel Aviv won 4–1 on aggregate.

18 August 2011
20:00

PAOK (Greece)	2–0	(Ukraine) Karpaty Lviv
Athanasiadis 15'; Lino 56'	Report

Toumba Stadium, Thessaloniki
Attendance: 21,424
Referee: Robert Malek (Poland)
25 August 2011
21:00

Karpaty Lviv (Ukraine)	1–1	(Greece) PAOK
Lucas 45' (pen.)	Report	Balafas 55'

Ukraina Stadium, Lviv
Attendance: 20,000
Referee: Fredy Fautrel (France)

PAOK won 3–1 on aggregate.

18 August 2011
21:00

Athletic Bilbao (Spain)	0–0	(Turkey) Trabzonspor
	Report

San Mamés Stadium, Bilbao
Attendance: 26,000
Referee: Daniele Orsato (Italy)
25 August 2011
20:30

Trabzonspor (Turkey)	Cancelled (Note: As a result of match-fixing allegations, Turkish club Fenerbahçe were removed from the 2011–12 UEFA Champions League and were replaced with Trabzonspor on 24 August 2011. As a result, Trabzonspor's second leg against Athletic Bilbao was cancelled, and Athletic Bilbao qualified for the group stage.)	(Spain) Athletic Bilbao
	Report

Türk Telekom Arena, Istanbul (Note: Trabzonspor were due to play their home match at Türk Telekom Arena, Istanbul as their own Hüseyin Avni Aker Stadium needed maintenance work after the 2011 European Youth Summer Olympic Festival.)
Referee: Knut Kircher (Germany)

Athletic Bilbao won on walkover as Trabzonspor were promoted to the Champions League.

18 August 2011
20:45

Heart of Midlothian (Scotland)	0–5	(England) Tottenham Hotspur
	Report	Van der Vaart 5'; Defoe 13'; Livermore 28'; Bale 63'; Lennon 78'

Tynecastle Stadium, Edinburgh
Attendance: 16,279
Referee: Paolo Tagliavento (Italy)
25 August 2011
21:00

Tottenham Hotspur (England)	0–0	(Scotland) Heart of Midlothian
	Report

White Hart Lane, London
Attendance: 32,590
Referee: Anastassios Kakos (Greece)

Tottenham Hotspur won 5–0 on aggregate.

18 August 2011
20:45

Maribor (Slovenia)	2–1	(Scotland) Rangers
Ibraimi 52'; Velikonja 90+2'	Report	Ortiz 31'

Ljudski vrt, Maribor
Attendance: 10,900
Referee: Manuel Gräfe (Germany)
25 August 2011
20:30

Rangers (Scotland)	1–1	(Slovenia) Maribor
Bocanegra 75'	Report	Volaš 55'

Ibrox Stadium, Glasgow
Attendance: 32,223
Referee: Aleksandar Stavrev (Macedonia)

Maribor won 3–2 on aggregate.

18 August 2011
19:30

Steaua București (Romania)	2–0	(Bulgaria) CSKA Sofia
Galamaz 16'; Tatu 77'	Report

Stadionul Dr. Constantin Rădulescu, Cluj-Napoca (Note: Steaua București played their home match at Stadionul Dr. Constantin Rădulescu, Cluj-Napoca as they have left their own Stadionul Steaua prior to the season.)
Attendance: 20,700
Referee: Tommy Skjerven (Norway)
25 August 2011
19:30

CSKA Sofia (Bulgaria)	1–1	(Romania) Steaua București
Michel 83'	Report	Tănase 73'

Vasil Levski National Stadium, Sofia (Note: CSKA Sofia played their home match at Vasil Levski National Stadium, Sofia as their own Balgarska Armiya Stadium did not meet the UEFA criteria.)
Attendance: 27,200
Referee: Pol van Boekel (Netherlands)

Steaua București won 3–1 on aggregate.

18 August 2011
20:00

Nordsjælland (Denmark)	0–0	(Portugal) Sporting CP
	Report

Farum Park, Farum
Attendance: 3,891
Referee: Mark Courtney (Northern Ireland)
25 August 2011
22:15

Sporting CP (Portugal)	2–1	(Denmark) Nordsjælland
Santos 77'; Evaldo 82'	Report	Laudrup 90+3'

Estádio José Alvalade, Lisbon
Attendance: 24,028
Referee: Ovidiu Hațegan (Romania)

Sporting CP won 2–1 on aggregate.

18 August 2011
20:30

Fulham (England)	3–0	(Ukraine) Dnipro Dnipropetrovsk
Hughes 38'; Dempsey 43', 49'	Report

Craven Cottage, London
Attendance: 14,823
Referee: Pavel Královec (Czech Republic)
25 August 2011
20:30

Dnipro Dnipropetrovsk (Ukraine)	1–0	(England) Fulham
Shakhov 23'	Report

Dnipro Arena, Dnipropetrovsk
Attendance: 12,750
Referee: Tom Harald Hagen (Norway)

Fulham won 3–1 on aggregate.

18 August 2011
18:00

Lokomotiv Moscow (Russia)	2–0	(Slovakia) Spartak Trnava
Yanbayev 34'; Maicon 37'	Report

Lokomotiv Stadium, Moscow
Attendance: 13,402
Referee: Alexandru Deaconu (Romania)
25 August 2011
19:00

Spartak Trnava (Slovakia)	1–1	(Russia) Lokomotiv Moscow
Yanbaev 38' (o.g.)	Report	Obinna 81' (pen.)

Štadión Antona Malatinského, Trnava
Attendance: 11,258
Referee: Luca Banti (Italy)

Lokomotiv Moscow won 3–1 on aggregate.

18 August 2011
21:05

Celtic (Scotland)	3–0 Awarded (Note: Celtic lodged protests over the eligibility of a number of the Sion players who participated in the two legs of the play-off round, which Sion won 3–1 aggregate (first leg: 0–0; second leg: 3–1). The UEFA Control and Disciplinary Body accepted the protests and decided to award both matches to Celtic by forfeit (3–0). As a consequence, Celtic qualified for the UEFA Europa League group stage.)	(Switzerland) Sion
	Report

Celtic Park, Glasgow
Attendance: 51,795
Referee: Marijo Strahonja (Croatia)
25 August 2011
20:30

Sion (Switzerland)	0–3 Awarded	(Scotland) Celtic
Feindouno 3' (pen.), 63'; Sio 82'	Report	Mulgrew 78'

Stade de Tourbillon, Sion
Attendance: 7,100
Referee: David Fernández Borbalán (Spain)

Celtic won 6–0 on aggregate.

18 August 2011
20:00

Śląsk Wrocław (Poland)	1–3	(Romania) Rapid București
Mila 16'	Report	Grigore 24'; Roman 34'; Apostol 79'

Stadion Oporowska, Wrocław
Attendance: 7,200
Referee: Michael Weiner (Germany)
25 August 2011
20:00

Rapid București (Romania)	1–1	(Poland) Śląsk Wrocław
Pancu 12'	Report	Sobota 90+2'

Stadionul Dan Păltinișanu, Timișoara (Note: Rapid București played their home match at Stadionul Dan Păltinișanu, Timișoara as they have left their own Stadionul Giulești-Valentin Stănescu prior to the season.)
Attendance: 3,383
Referee: Martin Hansson (Sweden)

Rapid București won 4–2 on aggregate.

18 August 2011
18:45

Litex Lovech (Bulgaria)	1–2	(Ukraine) Dynamo Kyiv
Yanev 13'	Report	Ninković 7' (pen.); Ideye 77'

Lovech Stadium, Lovech
Attendance: 5,862
Referee: Michael Koukoulakis (Greece)
25 August 2011
19:00

Dynamo Kyiv (Ukraine)	1–0	(Bulgaria) Litex Lovech
Milevskyi 74'	Report

Lobanovsky Dynamo Stadium, Kyiv
Attendance: 8,100
Referee: Stuart Attwell (England)

Dynamo Kyiv won 3–1 on aggregate.

18 August 2011
21:00

Lazio (Italy)	6–0	(North Macedonia) Rabotnicki
Hernanes 20'; Mauri 39'; Cissé 51', 65'; Rocchi 87'; Klose 90'	Report

Stadio Olimpico, Rome
Attendance: 24,532
Referee: Sergei Karasev (Russia)
25 August 2011
20:45

Rabotnicki (North Macedonia)	1–3	(Italy) Lazio
Lazarevski 39'	Report	Rocchi 23', 77'; Hernanes 74'

Philip II Arena, Skopje
Attendance: 7,100
Referee: Menashe Masiah (Israel)

Lazio won 9–1 on aggregate.

18 August 2011
20:45

Nacional (Portugal)	0–0	(England) Birmingham City
	Report

Estádio da Madeira, Funchal
Attendance: 4,323
Referee: Milorad Mažić (Serbia)
25 August 2011
20:45

Birmingham City (England)	3–0	(Portugal) Nacional
Redmond 15'; Murphy 24'; Wood 86'	Report

St Andrew's, Birmingham
Attendance: 27,698
Referee: Vladislav Bezborodov (Russia)

Birmingham City won 3–0 on aggregate.

18 August 2011
21:05

Ried (Austria)	0–0	(Netherlands) PSV Eindhoven
	Report

Keine Sorgen Arena, Ried im Innkreis
Attendance: 5,740
Referee: Peter Rasmussen (Denmark)
25 August 2011
18:45

PSV Eindhoven (Netherlands)	5–0	(Austria) Ried
Toivonen 53'; Lens 67'; Wijnaldum 74'; Labyad 79'; Strootman 90'	Report

Philips Stadion, Eindhoven
Attendance: 23,000
Referee: Maksim Layushkin (Russia)

PSV Eindhoven won 5–0 on aggregate.

18 August 2011
19:30

Thun (Switzerland)	0–1	(England) Stoke City
	Report	Pugh 18'

Arena Thun, Thun
Attendance: 7,150
Referee: Daniel Stålhammar (Sweden)
25 August 2011
20:45

Stoke City (England)	4–1	(Switzerland) Thun
Upson 25'; Jones 31', 72'; Whelan 38'	Report	Wittwer 77'

Britannia Stadium, Stoke-on-Trent
Attendance: 24,118
Referee: Marcin Borski (Poland)

Stoke City won 5–1 on aggregate.

18 August 2011
19:00

Aalesund (Norway)	2–1	(Netherlands) AZ
Barrantes 14' (pen.), 73'	Report	Martens 30'

Color Line Stadion, Ålesund
Attendance: 5,646
Referee: Stephan Studer (Switzerland)
25 August 2011
20:45

AZ (Netherlands)	6–0	(Norway) Aalesund
Wernbloom 7'; Altidore 25', 59'; Martens 54'; Holman 68'; Moisander 90' (pen.)	Report

AFAS Stadion, Alkmaar
Attendance: 11,814
Referee: Alan Kelly (Republic of Ireland)

AZ won 7–2 on aggregate.

18 August 2011
18:00

Vaslui (Romania)	2–0	(Czech Republic) Sparta Prague
Temwanjera 13'; Milanov 36'	Report

Stadionul Ceahlăul, Piatra Neamț (Note: Vaslui played their home match at Stadionul Ceahlăul, Piatra Neamț as their own Stadionul Municipal did not meet UEFA criteria.)
Attendance: 5,170
Referee: Zsolt Szabó (Hungary)
25 August 2011
20:00

Sparta Prague (Czech Republic)	1–0	(Romania) Vaslui
Pamić 59'	Report

Generali Arena, Prague
Attendance: 13,699
Referee: Thomas Einwaller (Austria)

Vaslui won 2–1 on aggregate.

18 August 2011
19:00

Omonia (Cyprus)	2–1	(Austria) Red Bull Salzburg
Freddy 35'; Leandro 45+3'	Report	Alan 3'

GSP Stadium, Nicosia
Attendance: 11,858
Referee: Lee Probert (England)
25 August 2011
21:05

Red Bull Salzburg (Austria)	1–0	(Cyprus) Omonia
Hinteregger 51'	Report

Bullen Arena, Wals-Siezenheim
Attendance: 9,100
Referee: Gediminas Mažeika (Lithuania)

2–2 on aggregate; Red Bull Salzburg won on away goals.

18 August 2011
18:30

Zestaponi (Georgia (country))	3–3	(Belgium) Club Brugge
Gelashvili 59', 83'; Dvali 63'	Report	Akpala 27'; Refaelov 30'; Hoefkens 72'

Boris Paichadze National Stadium, Tbilisi (Note: Zestaponi played their home match on Boris Paichadze National Stadium, Tbilisi as it has a greater capacity than their own David Abashidze Stadium.)
Attendance: 7,680
Referee: Harald Lechner (Austria)
25 August 2011
20:30

Club Brugge (Belgium)	2–0	(Georgia (country)) Zestaponi
Akpala 7', 27'	Report

Jan Breydel Stadium, Bruges
Attendance: 23,725
Referee: Tony Asumaa (Finland)

Club Brugge won 5–3 on aggregate.

18 August 2011
20:30

Hannover 96 (Germany)	2–1	(Spain) Sevilla
Schlaudraff 6', 45'	Report	Kanouté 37'

AWD-Arena, Hanover
Attendance: 43,500
Referee: Bas Nijhuis (Netherlands)
25 August 2011
21:05

Sevilla (Spain)	1–1	(Germany) Hannover 96
Pogatetz 37' (o.g.)	Report	Abdellaoue 23'

Ramón Sánchez Pizjuán, Seville
Attendance: 33,026
Referee: Serge Gumienny (Belgium)

Hannover 96 won 3–2 on aggregate.

18 August 2011
18:30

HJK (Finland)	2–0	(Germany) Schalke 04
Pukki 18', 54'	Report

Sonera Stadium, Helsinki
Attendance: 10,504
Referee: Fernando Teixeira Vitienes (Spain)
25 August 2011
20:20

Schalke 04 (Germany)	6–1	(Finland) HJK
Huntelaar 15' (pen.), 25', 49' (pen.), 63'; Papadopoulos 56'; Draxler 82'	Report	Pukki 20'

Veltins-Arena, Gelsenkirchen
Attendance: 52,034
Referee: Leontios Trattou (Cyprus)

Schalke 04 won 6–3 on aggregate.

18 August 2011
20:45

AEK Athens (Greece)	1–0	(Georgia (country)) Dinamo Tbilisi
José Carlos 87'	Report

Olympic Stadium, Athens
Attendance: 12,640
Referee: Simon Lee Evans (Wales)
25 August 2011
19:05

Dinamo Tbilisi (Georgia (country))	1–1 (a.e.t.)	(Greece) AEK Athens
Koshkadze 1'	Report	Leonardo 111' (pen.)

Boris Paichadze National Stadium, Tbilisi
Attendance: 40,000
Referee: Darko Čeferin (Slovenia)

AEK Athens won 2–1 on aggregate.

18 August 2011
20:30

Red Star Belgrade (Serbia)	1–2	(France) Rennes
Cadú 17' (pen.)	Report	Pitroipa 41'; Montaño 75'

Stadion FK Crvena Zvezda, Belgrade
Attendance: 51,862
Referee: Duarte Gomes (Portugal)
25 August 2011
18:30

Rennes (France)	4–0	(Serbia) Red Star Belgrade
Montaño 10'; M'Vila 19' (pen.); Pajot 85'; Kembo-Ekoko 90'	Report

Stade de la Route de Lorient, Rennes
Attendance: 19,364
Referee: Deniz Aytekin (Germany)

Rennes won 6–1 on aggregate.

18 August 2011
19:00

Austria Wien	3–1	(Romania) Gaz Metan Mediaș
Linz 7'; Barazite 45', 61'	Report	Breeveld 24'

Franz Horr Stadium, Vienna
Attendance: 9,100
Referee: Aleksei Kulbakov (Belarus)
25 August 2011
19:00

Gaz Metan Mediaș (Romania)	1–0	Austria Wien
Hoban 40'	Report

Stadionul Dr. Constantin Rădulescu, Cluj-Napoca (Note: Gaz Metan Mediaș played their home match at Stadionul Dr. Constantin Rădulescu, Cluj-Napoca as their own Stadionul Gaz Metan did not meet the UEFA criteria.)
Attendance: 3,700
Referee: Hüseyin Göçek (Turkey)

Austria Wien won 3–2 on aggregate.

18 August 2011
22:00

Braga (Portugal)	0–0	(Switzerland) Young Boys
	Report

Estádio Municipal de Braga, Braga
Attendance: 12,457
Referee: Pawel Gil (Poland)
25 August 2011
19:30

Young Boys (Switzerland)	2–2	(Portugal) Braga
Mayuka 61'; Farnerud 81'	Report	Barbosa 24'; Lima 78'

Stade de Suisse, Bern
Attendance: 15,012
Referee: Ivan Bebek (Croatia)

2–2 on aggregate; Braga won on away goals.

18 August 2011
20:15

Standard Liège (Belgium)	1–0	(Sweden) Helsingborgs IF
Tchité 60'	Report

Stade Maurice Dufrasne, Liège
Attendance: 10,457
Referee: Bülent Yıldırım (Turkey)
25 August 2011
20:15

Helsingborgs IF (Sweden)	1–3	(Belgium) Standard Liège
Jönsson 61' (pen.)	Report	Mbaye 14'; Berrier 34'; Kanu 68'

Olympia, Helsingborg
Attendance: 6,656
Referee: Saïd Ennjimi (France)

Standard Liège won 4–1 on aggregate.
