= Borislav Tsonev =

Bulgarian footballer

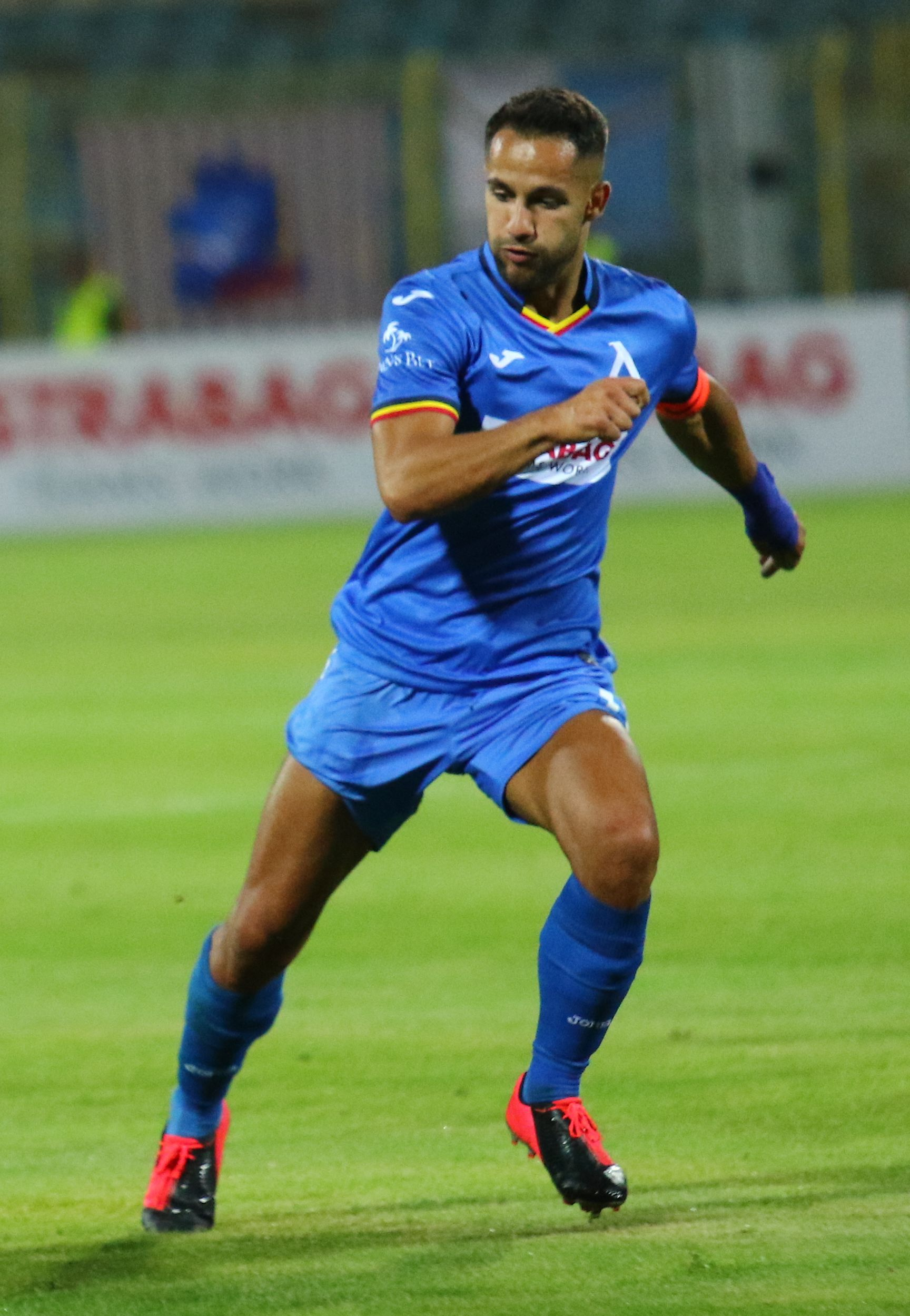

Personal information
- Full name: Borislav Aleksandrov Tsonev
- Date of birth: 29 April 1995 (age 31)
- Place of birth: Blagoevgrad, Bulgaria
- Height: 1.69 m (5 ft 6 1/2 in)
- Position: Midfielder

Team information
- Current team: CSKA 1948
- Number: 10

Youth career
- 2005–2009: Pirin Blagoevgrad
- 2009–2013: Levski Sofia

Senior career*
| Years | Team | Apps | (Gls) |
| 2011–2016 | Levski Sofia | 35 | (4) |
| 2016–2019 | Beroe Stara Zagora | 69 | (13) |
| 2019–2020 | Inter Zaprešić | 36 | (8) |
| 2020–2021 | Levski Sofia | 28 | (11) |
| 2022 | Chornomorets Odesa | 0 | (0) |
| 2022 | → Slavia Sofia (loan) | 6 | (1) |
| 2022–2023 | Dalian Pro | 46 | (11) |
| 2024–2025 | Arda Kardzhali | 52 | (6) |
| 2025– | CSKA 1948 | 30 | (3) |

International career^{‡}
| 2011–2012 | Bulgaria U17 | 2 | (0) |
| 2012–2014 | Bulgaria U19 | 9 | (0) |
| 2015–2016 | Bulgaria U21 | 8 | (1) |
| 2021– | Bulgaria | 8 | (0) |
- * Club domestic league appearances and goals as of 11 June 2026 ‡ National team caps and goals as of 22:45, 29 September 2026 (UTC)

Borislav Aleksandrov Tsonev (Bulgarian: Борислав Александров Цонев; born 29 April 1995) is a Bulgarian professional footballer who plays as a midfielder for First League club CSKA 1948 Sofia. He is a twin brother of Radoslav Tsonev.

== Career ==
Born in Blagoevgrad, Tsonev began playing football for local side Pirin. In 2009, he joined Levski Sofia's academy.

Borislav made his first team debut in a 3–0 league win over Montana on 27 May 2011, coming on as a substitute for Vladimir Gadzhev. On 29 April 2013, he signed his first professional contract with the club on his 18th birthday.

Tsonev scored his first goal for Levski on 18 September 2013, in a 4–0 win over Pirin Gotse Delchev in the first round of the Bulgarian Cup. In the second leg against Pirin on 12 October he made his first start for Levski. On 26 October, Tsonev made his first league start in a 1–0 home win over Botev Plovdiv, but was sent-off after 68 minutes.

On 11 October 2016, Tsonev signed a contract with Beroe Stara Zagora. On 25 November 2018, He scored a hat-trick in a 6–0 home win against Vereya.

In 2020, Tsonev, along with his twin brother Radoslav, returned to Levski Sofia. The two brothers immediately became the leaders of Levski on the pitch. Despite being simultaneously injured for a prolonged period, they gained somewhat of a cult status among fans due to their loyalty to the club at a time of financial hardship.

After joining Ukrainian club Chornomorets Odesa on a two-and-a-half-year contract in January 2022, he was forced to seek another team following the 2022 Russian invasion of Ukraine. In February 2022 he was loaned out to Slavia Sofia for three months.

On 21 August 2022, Tsonev joined Chinese club Dalian Professional on a free transfer.

On 6 February 2024, Tsonev returned to his home country to join Arda Kardzhali.

== International career ==
Tsonev received his first call-up for the senior Bulgarian squad on 29 August 2018 for the UEFA Nations League matches against Slovenia and Norway on 6 and 9 September. He earned his first cap three years later, appearing as a starter in the 4–1 win over Georgia in a friendly match on 8 September 2021.

== Career statistics ==
As of match played 31 May 2025

Appearances and goals by club, season and competition
| Club | Season | League | | | Cup | | Continental | | Total | |
| Club | Season | Division | Apps | Goals | Apps | Goals | Apps | Goals | Apps | Goals |
|---|---|---|---|---|---|---|---|---|---|---|
| Levski Sofia | 2010–11 | First League | 1 | 0 | 0 | 0 | 0 | 0 | 1 | 0 |
| Levski Sofia | 2011–12 | First League | 0 | 0 | 0 | 0 | 0 | 0 | 0 | 0 |
| Levski Sofia | 2012–13 | First League | 2 | 0 | 1 | 0 | 0 | 0 | 3 | 0 |
| Levski Sofia | 2013–14 | First League | 15 | 0 | 5 | 1 | 0 | 0 | 20 | 1 |
| Levski Sofia | 2014–15 | First League | 9 | 3 | 1 | 0 | — | | 10 | 3 |
| Levski Sofia | 2015–16 | First League | 8 | 1 | 0 | 0 | — | | 8 | 1 |
| Levski Sofia | Total | | 35 | 4 | 7 | 1 | 0 | 0 | 42 | 5 |
| Beroe Stara Zagora | 2016–17 | First League | 21 | 2 | 0 | 0 | 0 | 0 | 21 | 2 |
| Beroe Stara Zagora | 2017–18 | First League | 30 | 4 | 2 | 0 | — | | 32 | 4 |
| Beroe Stara Zagora | 2018–19 | First League | 18 | 7 | 2 | 1 | — | | 20 | 8 |
| Beroe Stara Zagora | Total | | 69 | 13 | 4 | 1 | 0 | 0 | 73 | 14 |
| Inter Zaprešić | 2018–19 | Prva HNL | 13 | 4 | 0 | 0 | — | | 13 | 4 |
| Inter Zaprešić | 2019–20 | Prva HNL | 23 | 4 | 2 | 2 | — | | 25 | 6 |
| Inter Zaprešić | Total | | 36 | 8 | 2 | 2 | — | | 38 | 10 |
| Levski Sofia | 2020–21 | First League | 10 | 6 | 0 | 0 | — | | 10 | 6 |
| Levski Sofia | 2021–22 | First League | 18 | 5 | 2 | 1 | — | | 20 | 6 |
| Levski Sofia | Total | | 28 | 11 | 2 | 1 | — | | 30 | 12 |
| Chornomorets Odesa | 2021–22 | Ukrainian Premier League | 0 | 0 | 0 | 0 | — | | 0 | 0 |
| Slavia Sofia (loan) | 2021–22 | First League | 6 | 1 | 2 | 0 | — | | 8 | 1 |
| Dalian Professional | 2022 | Chinese Super League | 19 | 7 | 1 | 0 | — | | 20 | 7 |
| Dalian Professional | 2023 | Chinese Super League | 27 | 4 | 4 | 1 | — | | 31 | 5 |
| Dalian Professional | Total | | 46 | 11 | 5 | 1 | — | | 51 | 12 |
| Arda Kardzhali | 2023–24 | First League | 15 | 2 | 1 | 0 | — | | 16 | 2 |
| Arda Kardzhali | 2024–25 | First League | 36 | 4 | 2 | 0 | 1 | 0 | 39 | 4 |
| Arda Kardzhali | Total | | 51 | 6 | 3 | 0 | 1 | 0 | 55 | 6 |
| Career total | | | 269 | 48 | 25 | 6 | 1 | 0 | 295 | 54 |

== Honours ==
Individual

- Bulgarian First League Goal of the Week: 2021–22 (Week 6) v. Beroe
