= Radoslav Tsonev =

Bulgarian footballer

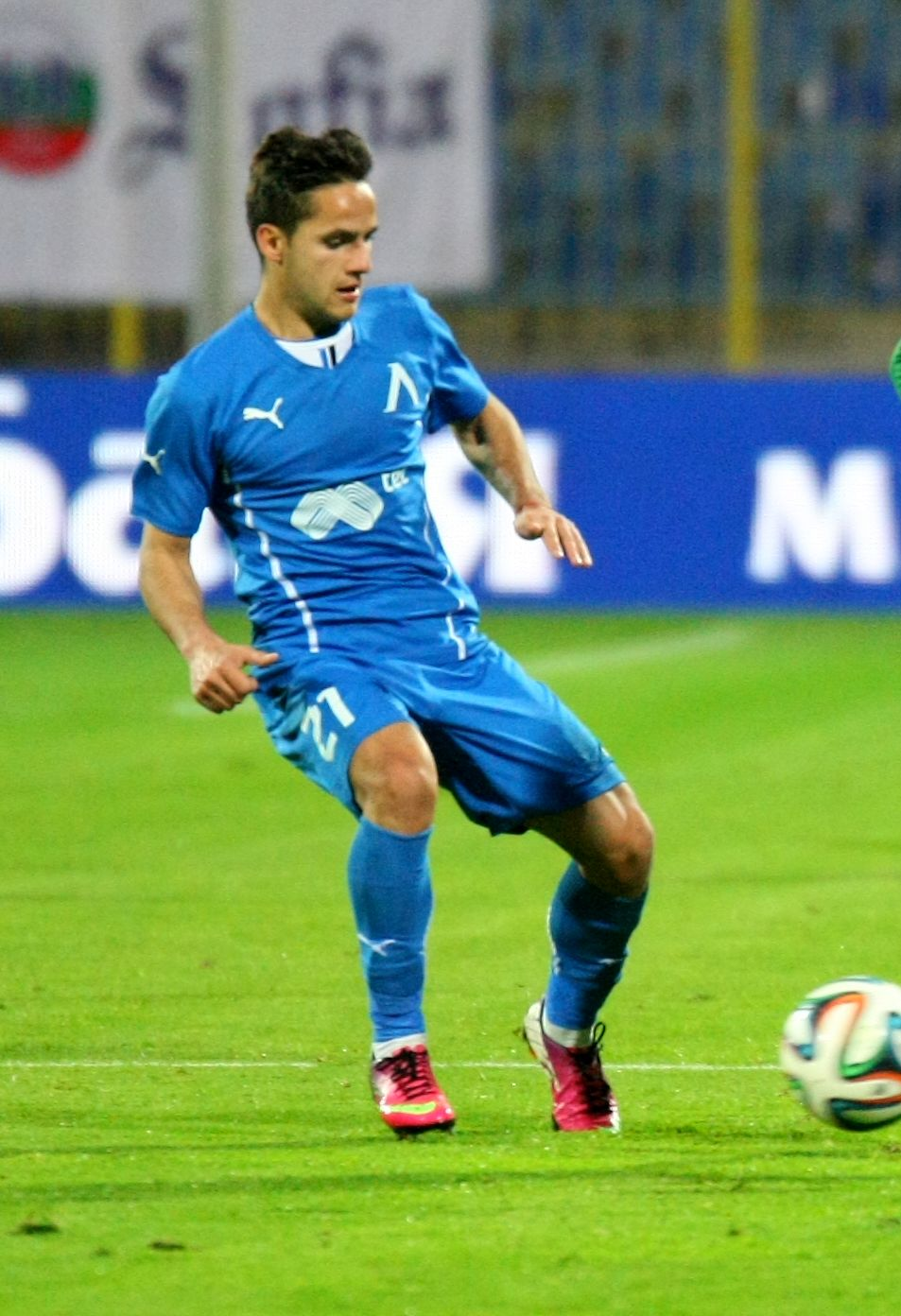

Personal information
- Full name: Radoslav Aleksandrov Tsonev
- Date of birth: 29 April 1995 (age 31)
- Place of birth: Blagoevgrad, Bulgaria
- Height: 1.71 m (5 ft 7 1/2 in)
- Position: Midfielder

Team information
- Current team: Botev Vratsa
- Number: 7

Youth career
- 2003–2009: Pirin Blagoevgrad
- 2009–2013: Levski Sofia

Senior career*
Years	Team	Apps	(Gls)
2011–2016	Levski Sofia	48	(3)
2013	→ Botev Vratsa (loan)	8	(0)
2016–2020	Lecce	48	(6)
2019	→ Viterbese (loan)	18	(3)
2020	→ Monopoli (loan)	6	(0)
2020–2022	Levski Sofia	28	(2)
2022	Pirin Blagoevgrad	12	(2)
2022–2024	Arda Kardzhali	37	(5)
2024–2025	Tobol	16	(0)
2025–	Botev Vratsa	30	(3)

International career^{‡}
2012	Bulgaria U17	3	(1)
2013–2014	Bulgaria U19	8	(0)
2014–2016	Bulgaria U21	11	(1)
2021–	Bulgaria	3	(0)
- * Club domestic league appearances and goals as of 11 June 2026 ‡ National team caps and goals as of 22:57, 15 November 2021 (UTC)

Radoslav Aleksandrov Tsonev (Bulgarian: Радослав Александров Цонев; born on 29 April 1995) is a Bulgarian professional footballer who plays as a midfielder for Bulgarian First League club Botev Vratsa. He is a twin brother of Borislav Tsonev.

== Club career ==
Radoslav made his first team debut in a 3–0 league win over Montana on 27 May 2011, coming on as a substitute for Darko Tasevski. He signed his first professional contract with the club on 29 April 2013.

Tsonev scored his first goal for Levski in the Eternal derby of Bulgarian football against CSKA Sofia on 21 April 2014.

On 25 January 2020, he joined Monopoli on loan for the rest of the 2019–20 season.

In the summer of 2020, Tsonev along with his twin brother Borislav returned to Levski. He remained there for the following two seasons. During the first of these two seasons, the two brothers were the leaders of Levski, gaining somewhat of a cult status among fans due to their loyalty to the club in times of financial hardship. Following the appointment of Stanimir Stoilov in September 2021, Tsonev progressively lost his place in the starting eleven. During the spring phase of the 2021-22 season Tsonev featured rarely on the pitch. His contract was not renewed.

In August 2022, Tsonev returned to his boyhood club Pirin Blagoevgrad.

== International career ==
He made his debut for the Bulgaria national football team on 12 October 2021 in a World Cup qualifier against the Northern Ireland.

== Honours ==
Levski Sofia

- Bulgarian Cup: 2021–22

== Statistics ==
=== Club ===
As of 23 October 2024

Club performance			League		National cup		League cup		Continental		Other		Total	
Club	League	Season	Apps	Goals	Apps	Goals	Apps	Goals	Apps	Goals	Apps	Goals	Apps	Goals
Levski Sofia	2010–11	A Group	1	0	0	0	–		0	0	–		1	0
Levski Sofia	2011–12	A Group	0	0	1	0	–		0	0	–		1	0
Levski Sofia	2012–13	A Group	0	0	1	0	–		0	0	–		1	0
Levski Sofia	2013–14	A Group	10	1	1	0	–		0	0	–		11	1
Levski Sofia	2014–15	A Group	10	2	4	1	–		–		–		14	3
Levski Sofia	2015–16	A Group	27	0	3	0	–		–		–		30	0
Levski Sofia	Total		48	3	8	1	0	0	0	0	0	0	56	4
Botev Vratsa (loan)	2013–14	B Group	8	0	1	1	–		–		–		9	1
Lecce	2016–17	Lega Pro/C	27	4	1	0	–		–		–		28	4
Lecce	2017–18	Serie C/C	21	2	2	0	–		–		–		23	2
Lecce	2018–19	Serie B	0	0	0	0	–		–		–		0	0
Lecce	Total		48	6	3	0	0	0	0	0	0	0	51	6
Viterbese Castrense (loan)	2018–19	Serie C/C	18	3	6	0	–		–		2	0	26	3
Monopoli (loan)	2019–20	Serie C/C	6	0	0	0	–		–		1	0	7	0
Levski Sofia	2020–21	First League	6	1	0	0	–		–		–		6	1
Levski Sofia	2021–22	First League	22	1	3	0	–		–		–		25	1
Levski Sofia	Total		28	2	3	0	0	0	0	0	3	0	31	2
Pirin Blagoevgrad	2022–23	First League	12	2	1	0	–		–		–		13	2
Arda Kardzhali	2022–23	First League	17	4	1	0	–		–		1	0	19	4
Arda Kardzhali	2023–24	First League	20	1	2	2	–		–		1	0	22	3
Arda Kardzhali	Total		37	5	3	2	0	0	0	0	1	0	41	7
Tobol	2024	Kazakhstan Premier League	16	0	3	1	1	1	2	0	0	0	22	2
Tobol	2025	Kazakhstan Premier League	0	0	0	0	0	0	–		–		0	0
Tobol	Total		16	0	3	1	1	1	2	0	0	0	22	2
Botev Vratsa	2025–26	First League	0	0	0	0	–		–		–		0	0
Career total			222	21	29	5	1	1	2	0	4	0	259	25
