= Souleymane Diamouténé =

Malian footballer (born 1983)

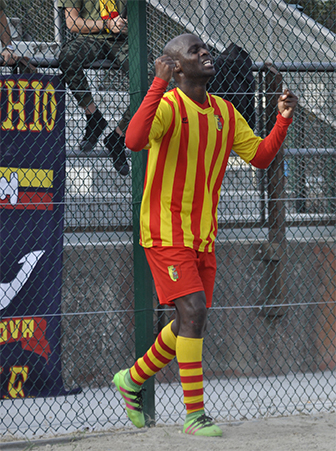
- Diamouténé during the 2019–20 season

Personal information
- Full name: Souleymane Adama Diamouténé
- Date of birth: 30 January 1983 (age 43)
- Place of birth: Sikasso, Mali
- Height: 1.85 m (6 ft 1 in)
- Position: Defender

Youth career
- Djoliba AC
- Udinese

Senior career*
Years	Team	Apps	(Gls)
2001–2004	Lucchese	27	(0)
2003–2004	→ Perugia (loan)	24	(0)
2004–2012	Lecce	144	(6)
2009	→ Roma (loan)	4	(0)
2009–2010	→ Bari (loan)	3	(0)
2011	→ Pescara (loan)	13	(1)
2012	Levski Sofia	15	(1)
2013–2014	Lupa Roma	13	(1)
2015	Fidelis Andria	7	(0)
2015–2016	Pescara	1	(0)
2016–2018	Gżira United	36	(1)
2018–2019	Igea Virtus	15	(0)
2019–2020	Real Giulianova	20	(2)
Total		322	(12)

International career
2003–2010	Mali	46	(1)
- * Club domestic league appearances and goals

Souleymane Adama Diamouténé (born 30 January 1983) is a Malian former professional footballer who played as a defender.

== Club career ==
Diamouténé was born in Sikasso. He spent his professional career in Italy, moving in the country after being noted by an Udinese scout. He then trained with the zebrette under-19 squad for a few months between 1999 and 2000, without being officially signed. After a friendly against Pisa, he was spotted by Francesco D'Arrigo, the head coach of the nerazzurri, who successfully signed him with his next club, Serie C1's Lucchese. Diamouténé spent two seasons with Lucchese, and in 2003 he was signed by Perugia.

In 2004, Diamouténé joined U.S. Lecce, becoming a mainstay of the salentini under coach Zdenek Zeman. He played two seasons in Serie A (2004–05, 2005–06) and two in Serie B (2006–07, 2007–08). He was confirmed with Lecce for the 2008–09 season, the first one back in the top flight for his club, but in January 2009, he was loaned to Roma with a pre-set price of €3.15M as a replacement for outgoing Christian Panucci.

On 31 August 2009, Diamouténé joined Bari on a loan deal.

On 10 February 2012, it was announced that Diamouténé had signed a one-and-a-half-year contract with Bulgarian A PFG club Levski Sofia. He was handed the number 25 shirt. On 23 May 2012, Diamouténé scored his first goal for Levski in a 7–0 win over PFC Svetkavitsa. In August 2016, he joined Maltese club Gżira United.

== International career ==
At youth level, Diamouténé played at the 1999 FIFA U-17 World Championship.

He represented the Mali national team at the 2004 African Cup of Nations in Tunisia, the 2008 Africa Cup of Nations in Ghana and the 2010 Africa Cup of Nations in Angola.

== Career statistics ==
=== Club ===
As of 1 July 2012

Appearances and goals by club, season and competition
Club	Season	League			Cup		Continental		Other		Total	
Club	Season	Division	Apps	Goals	Apps	Goals	Apps	Goals	Apps	Goals	Apps	Goals
Lucchese	2001–02	Serie C1	2	0			–		–		2	0
Lucchese	2002–03	Serie C1	25	0			–		2 (Note: Two appearances in relegation playoffs)	0	27	0
Lucchese	Total		27	0	0	0	0	0	2	0	29	0
Perugia	2003–04	Serie A	24	0			12	0	–		36	0
Lecce	2004–05	Serie A	33	1			–		–		33	1
Lecce	2005–06	Serie A	33	0	1	0	–		–		34	0
Lecce	2006–07	Serie B	37	3	1	0	–		–		38	3
Lecce	2007–08	Serie B	31	2	1	0	–		2 (Note: Two appearances in promotion playoffs)	0	34	2
Lecce	2008–09	Serie A	8	0	1	0	–		–		9	0
Lecce	2009–10	Serie B	0	0	1	0	–		–		1	0
Lecce	2010–11	Serie A	2	1	1	0	–		–		3	1
Lecce	2011–12	Serie A	0	0	0	0	–		–		0	0
Lecce	Total		144	6	6	0	0	0	2	0	152	6
Roma (loan)	2008–09	Serie A	4	0	0	0	2	0	–		6	0
Bari (loan)	2009–10	Serie A	3	0	0	0	–		–		3	0
Pescara (loan)	2010–11	Serie B	13	1	0	0	–		–		13	1
Career total			215	7	6	0	14	0	4	0	239	7

=== International ===
Score and result list Mali's goal tally first, score column indicates score after Diamouténé goal.

International goal scored by Souleymane Diamouténé
No.	Date	Venue	Opponent	Score	Result	Competition
1	5 June 2005	Stade Amari Daou, Ségou, Mali	Liberia	3–0	4–1	2006 World Cup qualifier

== Honours ==
Perugia

- Intertoto Cup: 2003
