= Todor Hristov =

Bulgarian footballer

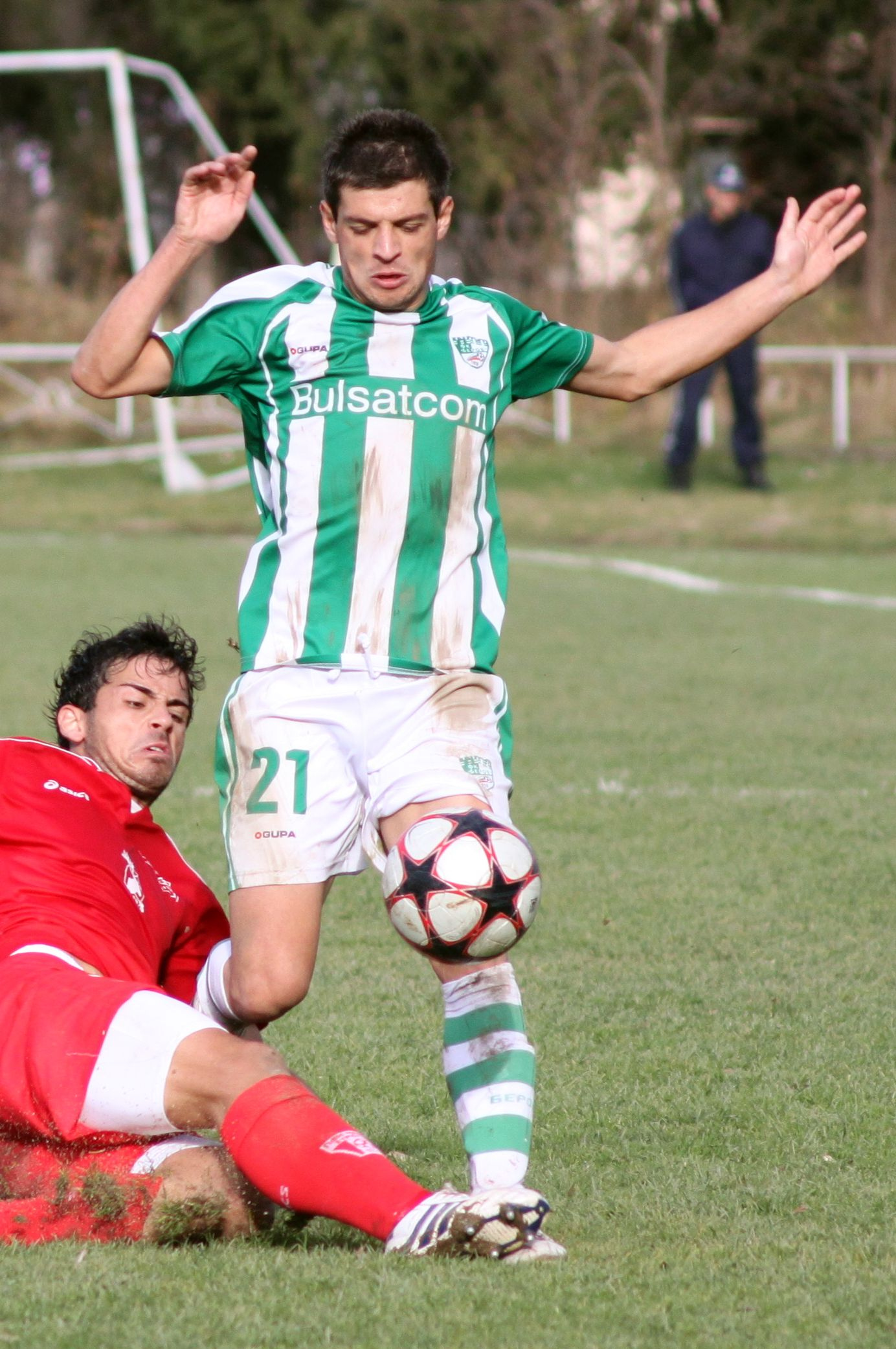

Personal information
- Full name: Todor Plamenov Hristov
- Date of birth: 25 September 1987 (age 39)
- Place of birth: Popovo, Bulgaria
- Height: 1.73 m (5 ft 8 in)
- Position: Left winger

Team information
- Current team: Einherji
- Number: 19

Youth career
- Septemvri Sofia

Senior career*
Years	Team	Apps	(Gls)
2005	Marek Dupnitsa	4	(0)
2005–2007	Svilengrad 1921		
2007	Montana	4	(0)
2008	Septemvri Sofia		
2008	Lyubimets 2007	1	(0)
2009	Svilengrad 1921	25	(9)
2010	Nesebar	9	(1)
2010–2011	Beroe Stara Zagora	34	(3)
2011	Levski Sofia	9	(0)
2012	Beroe Stara Zagora	20	(1)
2013	Marek Dupnitsa	?	(?)
2013	Lokomotiv Sofia	4	(0)
2014	Akademik Svishtov	7	(0)
2014	Víkingur	9	(1)
2015–	Einherji	81	(47)
- * Club domestic league appearances and goals as of 15 November 2019

Todor Hristov (Bulgarian: Тодор Христов; born 25 September 1987) is a Bulgarian football midfielder who currently plays for Icelandic club Einherji

== Career ==
Todor Hristov played his first full season in the Bulgarian top division during the 2010–2011 season when he played for Beroe Stara Zagora

=== Levski Sofia ===
On 9 June 2011 he signed for Levski Sofia. Hristov appeared in only 7 league games for Levski, and 9 in all competitions. It soon became evident that Levski's board was desperate to sell Hristov, as he was forced to train with the reserves, as well as the youth team.

=== Return to Beroe ===
On 29 February 2012, it was announced that Hristov had returned to Beroe, for a reported fee of around 180,000 leva, after failing to secure a spot in Levski's starting eleven. Hristov played a total of 9 matches for Levski (426 minutes), and only once played the full 90 minutes, in a Bulgarian Cup game against FC Bansko.

=== Lokomotiv Sofia ===
He signed with Lokomotiv Sofia in May 2013.

== Career statistics ==
As of 24 June 2011

Club	Season	League		Cup		Europe		Total	
Club	Season	Apps	Goals	Apps	Goals	Apps	Goals	Apps	Goals
Levski Sofia	2011–12	0	0	0	0	0	0	0	0
Career totals		0	0	0	0	0	0	0	0
