= Juninho (footballer, born July 1985) =

Brazilian footballer

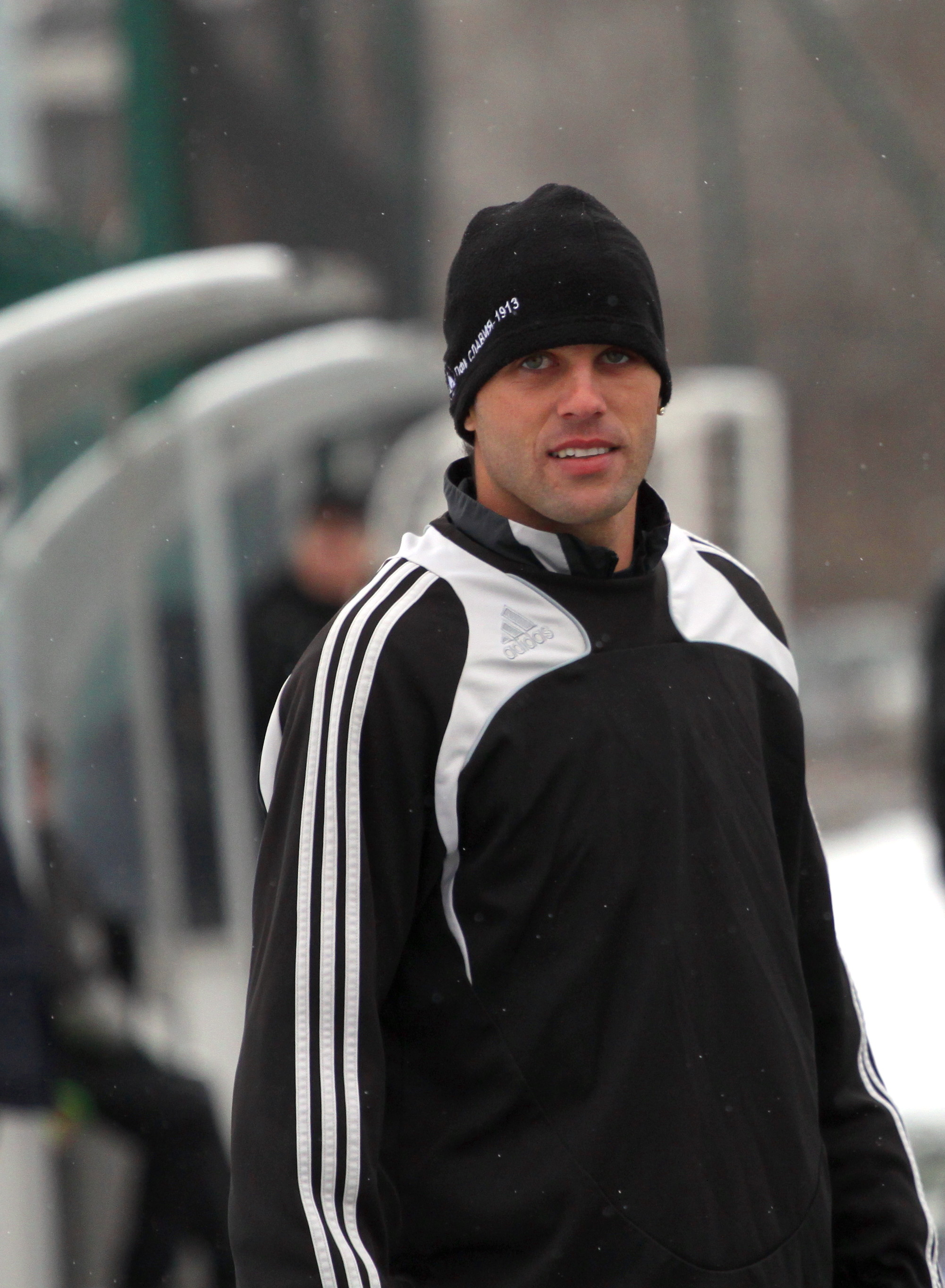

Personal information
- Full name: José Carlos Nogueira Júnior
- Date of birth: 18 July 1985 (age 41)
- Place of birth: Guarapari, Brazil
- Height: 1.75 m (5 ft 9 in)
- Position: Striker

Senior career*
Years	Team	Apps	(Gls)
2008	Rio Branco AC		
2009	Duque de Caxias	0	(0)
2009–2013	Slavia Sofia	57	(22)
2010	→ Banants (loan)	10	(3)
2012	→ Levski Sofia (loan)	14	(6)
2012–2013	→ Adana Demirspor (loan)	32	(14)
2013–2014	Adana Demirspor	26	(10)
2014–2015	Karşıyaka	27	(4)
2015–2016	Milsami Orhei	5	(0)
2017–2018	Caldense	0	(0)
2018–2019	Tupi	5	(0)
2019–2020	Xewkija Tigers	20	(13)
- * Club domestic league appearances and goals as of 17:00, 24 September 2022 (UTC)

José Carlos Nogueira Júnior, commonly known as Juninho or José Júnior (born 18 July 1985), is a Brazilian professional footballer who plays as a forward.

== Career ==
In early of 2009, Juninho joined Duque de Caxias. He made his competitive debut on 31 January, in a 3–1 Campeonato Carioca loss against Vasco da Gama, when he came on for Dudu in the 66th minute. Juninho scored his first goal on 31 March, netting Duque's second in a 4–2 victory over Mesquita.

In July 2009, after short trial period, he was bought by Bulgarian A PFG club Slavia Sofia. He made his competitive debut on 10 August, during an A PFG match against Sportist Svoge. Juninho proved crucial for many Slavia matches, making his famous runs down the left wing, and quickly became a first choice for the left winger or second striker position. On 29 August he scored his first goal for the club against Levski Sofia but Slavia went on to lose the game 3–1. On 22 November Juninho scored three goals against Chernomorets Burgas and became the second foreign player after Ljubomir Vorkapić to score a hat trick for Slavia in the team's history.

On 20 August 2010, he moved to Armenian side Banants on until the end of the year.

On 13 February 2012, it was announced that Juninho join fellow A PFG side Levski Sofia on loan for the rest of the 2011–12 season, with an option to make the move permanent.

On 5 September 2012, Juninho agreed to go on a loan to Turkish side Adana Demirspor which is commonly called as The Blue Lightning – Mavi Şimşekler. He made his debut on 16 September 2012 at the TFF First League against Denizlispor. He scored his first goal for Adana Demirspor on the 44th minute of the match against Kayseri Erciyesspor. Juninho carried his team to playoffs with 14 league goals which made him the third top scorer in TFF First League in 2012–13 season but Adana Demirspor were eliminated by Manisaspor in semi-final of playoffs and postponed its chance to promote Süper Lig to another year.

== Career statistics ==
Appearances and goals by club, season and competition
Club	Season	League		Cup		Carioca		Continental		Total	
Club	Season	Apps	Goals	Apps	Goals	Apps	Goals	Apps	Goals	Apps	Goals
Duque de Caxias	2009	0	0	0	0	7	1	–		7	1
Slavia Sofia	2009–10	27	12	3	0	–		–		30	12
Slavia Sofia	2010–11	3	0	0	0	–		–		3	0
Slavia Sofia	2010–11	10	1	3	0	–		–		13	1
Slavia Sofia	2011–12	14	6	1	0	–		–		15	6
Slavia Sofia	Total	54	19	7	0	–		–		61	19
Banants (loan)	2010–11	10	3	0	0	–		–		10	3
Levski Sofia (loan)	2011–12	14	6	1	0	–		–		15	6
Adana Demirspor (loan)	2012–13	32	14	0	0	–		–		32	14
Adana Demirspor	2013–14	17	4	1	1	–		–		17	5
Career total		127	46	9	1	7	1	0	0	142	48
