= Aleksandar Bashliev =

Bulgarian footballer

Personal information
- Full name: Aleksandar Kirilov Bashliev
- Date of birth: 16 November 1989 (age 37)
- Place of birth: Blagoevgrad, Bulgaria
- Height: 1.82 m (6 ft 0 in)
- Position: Right-back

Team information
- Current team: Vihren Sandanski
- Number: 21

Senior career*
Years	Team	Apps	(Gls)
2009–2010	Septemvri Simitli	28	(1)
2010–2011	Pirin Blagoevgrad	23	(1)
2011–2012	Levski Sofia	8	(0)
2013	Chernomorets Burgas	7	(0)
2013–2018	Pirin Blagoevgrad	112	(9)
2019–2020	Septemvri Sofia	21	(0)
2020–2022	Montana	63	(1)
2022–2025	Marek Dupnitsa	96	(2)
2025–	Vihren Sandanski	32	(2)
- * Club domestic league appearances and goals as of 11 June 2026

Aleksandar Bashliev (Bulgarian: Александър Башлиев; born 16 November 1989) is a Bulgarian professional footballer who plays as a right-back for Vihren Sandanski.

== Club career ==
Bashliev signed his first professional contract with Septemvri Simitli. He was capped 28 times for the team, scoring 1 goal. Later, during the 2010–11 season, he played for Pirin Blagoevgrad. There, Bashliev scored his first A PFG goal on 16 April 2011 in a 1–0 home win against Kaliakra Kavarna.

=== Levski Sofia ===
During the summer of 2011, Bashliev was bought by Levski Sofia. On 2 July 2011, he made his unofficial debut for Levski in the 1:0 win against Loko Sofia in an exhibition match. His official debut occurred on 8 August 2011, in the 1:0 win against Slavia Sofia, during which he came on as a substitute.

=== Chernomorets Burgas ===
On 9 January 2013, Bashliev was transferred to Chernomorets Burgas as a part of the deal for Plamen Dimov to Levski Sofia. He was released at the end of season.

=== International career ===
Bashliev received his first call-up to the Bulgaria national team for a June 2017 World Cup qualifier against Belarus, but did not debut.

== Career statistics ==
As of 24 June 2011

Club	Season	League		Cup		Europe		Total	
Club	Season	Apps	Goals	Apps	Goals	Apps	Goals	Apps	Goals
Levski Sofia	2011–12	5	0	1	0	0	0	6	0
Levski Sofia	2012–13	3	0	3	0	0	0	6	0
Career totals		0	0	0	0	0	0	0	0
