= Ladislav Tomaček =

Slovak footballer

Personal information
- Full name: Ladislav Tomaček
- Date of birth: 26 September 1982 (age 44)
- Place of birth: Galanta, Czechoslovakia
- Height: 1.88 m (6 ft 2 in)
- Position: Forward

Team information
- Current team: Sereď
- Number: 11

Youth career
- FC Slovan Galanta

Senior career*
Years	Team	Apps	(Gls)
2002–2003	ŠKP		
2003–2004	Teplice	0	(0)
2004	→ Ústí nad Labem (loan)		
2005–2007	Močenok		
2007	Banská Bystrica	8	(1)
2008–2010	Sereď		
2011–2013	Spartak Trnava	50	(12)
2013–	Sereď	0	(0)
- * Club domestic league appearances and goals as of 26 May 2013

Ladislav Tomaček (born 26 September 1982) is a Slovak football forward who plays for Sereď.

== Career ==
He joined Spartak Trnava in January 2011 from Sereď. In 2011/2012 season of Europa League, he scored two crucial goals against Bulgarian giant Levski Sofia. His goals helped Trnava gain promotion to the next round.

== Career statistics ==
As of 25 May 2012

Club performance			League		Cup		Continental		Total	
Season	Club	League	Apps	Goals	Apps	Goals	Apps	Goals	Apps	Goals
Slovakia			League		Slovak Cup		Europe		Total	
2010–11	FC Spartak Trnava	Corgoň Liga	9	4	2	2	0	0	11	6
2011–12	FC Spartak Trnava	Corgoň Liga	25	6	3	1	6	6	34	13
Career total			34	10	5	3	6	6	45	19
