= Vladimir Gadzhev =

Bulgarian footballer

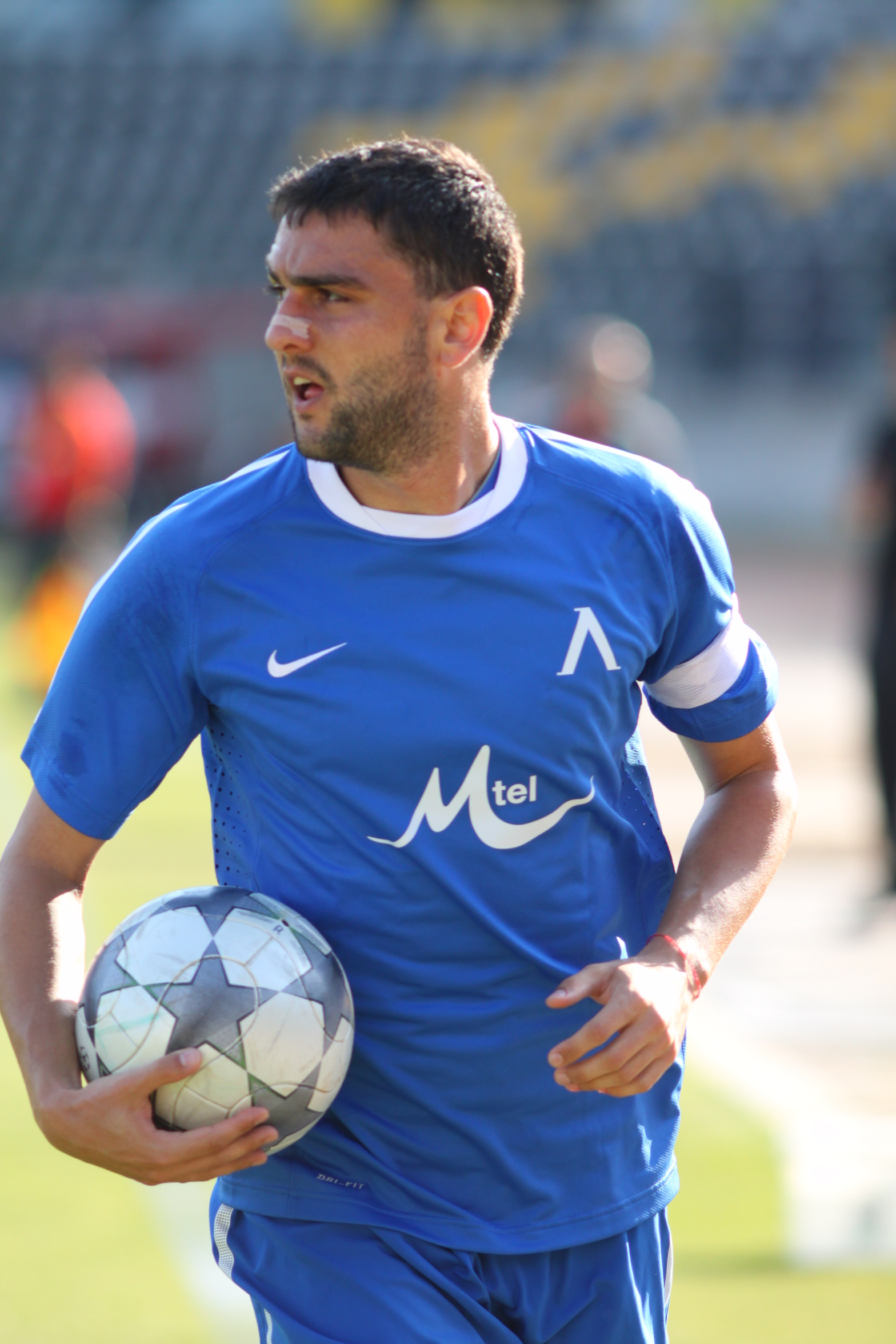
- Gadzhev playing for Levski Sofia in 2011

Personal information
- Full name: Vladimir Georgiev Gadzhev
- Date of birth: 18 July 1987 (age 39)
- Place of birth: Pazardzhik, Bulgaria
- Height: 1.80 m (5 ft 11 in)
- Position: Midfielder

Youth career
- 1994–2004: Levski Sofia
- 2004–2006: Panathinaikos

Senior career*
| Years | Team | Apps | (Gls) |
| 2006–2009 | Panathinaikos | 0 | (0) |
| 2006–2007 | → Levadiakos (loan) | 26 | (5) |
| 2007–2008 | → OFI (loan) | 19 | (0) |
| 2008–2009 | → Levski Sofia (loan) | 23 | (1) |
| 2009–2016 | Levski Sofia | 143 | (21) |
| 2016–2017 | Coventry City | 16 | (1) |
| 2017–2018 | Anorthosis | 24 | (1) |
| 2018–2019 | Beroe | 9 | (0) |
| 2019–2020 | Hebar | 9 | (0) |
| Total | | 269 | (29) |

International career
| 2007–2008 | Bulgaria U21 | | |
| 2010–2015 | Bulgaria | 22 | (1) |
- * Club domestic league appearances and goals

Vladimir Gadzhev (Bulgarian: Владимир Гаджев; born 18 July 1987) is a Bulgarian former professional footballer who played as a midfielder. He was known for his goals from long distance.

A product of the Levski Sofia Academy, Gadzhev joined Greek side Panathinaikos in 2004. He had three loan spells away from Panathinaikos. He was loaned to Levadiakos in 2006, OFI in 2007 and Levski in 2008, and signed for Levski on a permanent basis in 2009.

== Career ==
=== Youth career ===
Gadzhev is a product of Levski Sofia's youth academy.

=== Panathinaikos ===
In the summer of 2004, at the age of 17, Gadzhev joined Greek side Panathinaikos but failed to break into the first team and was eventually loaned to Beta Ethniki side Levadiakos for the 2006–07 season. He earned 26 appearances for Levadiakos, scored five goals and helping his team gain promotion to the Super League Greece. For the following campaign Gadzhev was loaned out to Super League club OFI, where he made 18 appearances.

=== Levski Sofia ===
On 4 July 2008, Levski signed Gadzhev on a season-long loan deal. He made his Bulgarian A Group debut in a 1–0 away loss against Vihren Sandanski on 9 August. He scored his first goal for Levski on 27 August, netting the equalizer in the 1–1 away draw against BATE Borisov in the third qualifying round of the 2008–09 UEFA Champions League. Gadzhev play regularly in his first season, making 23 league appearances and collected his first A Group title winner's medal at the end of the 2008–09 season. On 31 May 2009, in the penultimate game of the campaign against Minyor Pernik, Gadzhev scored his first league goal for Levski, clinching the draw 1–1 and the title for the club.

On 7 July 2009, Gadzhev signed a permanent contract with Levski for an undisclosed fee. A week later, he scored his first goal of the 2009–10 season, netting the fourth in a 4–0 win over Sant Julià in the 2nd Qualifying round of Champions League at Georgi Asparuhov Stadium. On 1 August, Gadzhev came on as a substitute in the 2009 Bulgarian Supercup against Litex Lovech. Unfortunately at the end of the game he received a very heavy injury. The diagnose was damaged torn knee ligaments. Cause of that he missed the first part of the season. However, in January 2010 it was announced that Gadzhev recovered from his injury. He made his comeback for Levski from a serious knee injury on 16 March 2010, playing for 60 minutes as a captain of the reserves' 2–2 draw against Litex Lovech. On 20 March, Gadzhev featured as substitute in Levski's 3–0 win over Slavia Sofia in the A Group. On 2 May 2010, he scored the equalizer in a 1–1 away draw with Cherno More.

On 28 July 2011, Gadzhev scored the equalizing goal against Spartak Trnava in UEFA Europa League and afterwards Levski won the game with a 2–1 final score. On 21 November 2011, he signed a two-year contract extension, keeping him at Levski until 2014.

On 17 March 2013, Gadzhev made his 100th league appearance for Levski in a 0–0 draw against Montana.

On 25 September 2013, Gadzhev scored his first brace for the club in a 6–0 win over Neftochimic Burgas.

On 23 May 2014, Gadzhev announced that he would leave Levski. On 1 July, however, he re-signed a new one-year contract with Levski. A few days later, Gadzhev was stripped of the captaincy by new manager Pepe Murcia. After the departure of Valeri Bojinov in August, he was again given the captaincy.

On 7 January 2016 he signed a pre-contract with the Russian team FC Kuban Krasnodar, but 2 weeks later his contract was annulled due to the uncertain financial situation at the club.

=== Coventry City ===
On 24 March 2016, after a successful trial period, Gadzhev signed a contract with English club Coventry City until June 2017. He scored his first goal for Coventry in a 3-2 EFL Cup win against Portsmouth on 9 August 2016. He was an unused substitute as Coventry won the 2017 EFL Trophy Final.

=== Trivia ===
Gadzhev holds the record for the most red cards in The Eternal Derby of Bulgaria, having been sent off three times, though on two of these occasions it did not affect the proceedings on the pitch, as he was ejected from the bench as well as after the final whistle.

== International career ==
Gadzhev made his international debut on 17 November 2010 in a friendly match against Serbia. Vladimir came in as a substitution in the 65th minute. However, Bulgaria lost the match with a score of 0–1. He scored his first goal in a 2–1 home win over Belarus national football team, a precise long-distance header.

== Post-playing pursuits ==
Following his retirement, in 2024 Gadzhev briefly served as president of Hebar.

== Career statistics ==
=== Club ===
Appearances and goals by club, season and competition
| Club | Season | League | | | National Cup | | League Cup | | Other | | Total | |
| Club | Season | Division | Apps | Goals | Apps | Goals | Apps | Goals | Apps | Goals | Apps | Goals |
|---|---|---|---|---|---|---|---|---|---|---|---|---|
| Panathinaikos | 2006–07 | Super League Greece | 0 | 0 | 0 | 0 | 0 | 0 | 0 | 0 | 0 | 0 |
| Panathinaikos | 2007–08 | Super League Greece | 0 | 0 | 0 | 0 | 0 | 0 | 0 | 0 | 0 | 0 |
| Panathinaikos | 2008–09 | Super League Greece | 0 | 0 | 0 | 0 | 0 | 0 | 0 | 0 | 0 | 0 |
| Panathinaikos | Total | | 0 | 0 | 0 | 0 | 0 | 0 | 0 | 0 | 0 | 0 |
| Levadiakos (loan) | 2006–07 | Football League | 26 | 5 | 0 | 0 | 0 | 0 | 0 | 0 | 26 | 5 |
| OFI (loan) | 2007–08 | Super League Greece | 19 | 0 | 5 | 0 | 0 | 0 | 0 | 0 | 24 | 0 |
| Levski Sofia (loan) | 2008–09 | A Group | 23 | 1 | 4 | 1 | 0 | 0 | 3 (Note: One appearance in 2008–09 UEFA Champions League Qualification and two appearances in 2008–09 UEFA Cup first round.) | 1 | 30 | 3 |
| Levski Sofia | 2009–10 | A Group | 10 | 1 | 0 | 0 | 0 | 0 | 3 (Note: Appearances in 2009–10 UEFA Champions League Qualification.) | 1 | 13 | 2 |
| Levski Sofia | 2010–11 | A Group | 23 | 2 | 3 | 1 | 0 | 0 | 10 (Note: Six appearances in 2010–11 UEFA Europa League Qualification and Four appearances in 2010–11 UEFA Europa League.) | 1 | 36 | 4 |
| Levski Sofia | 2011–12 | A Group | 27 | 6 | 2 | 0 | 0 | 0 | 2 (Note: Appearances in 2011–12 UEFA Europa League Qualification.) | 1 | 31 | 7 |
| Levski Sofia | 2012–13 | A Group | 22 | 1 | 4 | 0 | 0 | 0 | 2 (Note: Appearances in 2012–13 UEFA Europa League Qualification.) | 0 | 28 | 1 |
| Levski Sofia | 2013–14 | A Group | 32 | 5 | 3 | 0 | 0 | 0 | 1 (Note: Appearances in 2013–14 UEFA Europa League Qualification.) | 0 | 36 | 5 |
| Levski Sofia | 2014–15 | A Group | 22 | 5 | 6 | 0 | 0 | 0 | 0 | 0 | 28 | 5 |
| Levski Sofia | 2015–16 | A Group | 7 | 1 | 3 | 0 | 0 | 0 | 0 | 0 | 10 | 1 |
| Levski Sofia | Total | | 166 | 22 | 25 | 2 | 0 | 0 | 21 | 4 | 212 | 28 |
| Coventry City | 2015–16 | League One | 2 | 0 | 0 | 0 | 0 | 0 | 0 | 0 | 2 | 0 |
| Coventry City | 2016–17 | League One | 14 | 1 | 2 | 0 | 2 | 1 | 4 | 0 | 22 | 2 |
| Coventry City | Total | | 16 | 1 | 2 | 0 | 2 | 1 | 4 | 0 | 24 | 2 |
| Anorthosis | 2017–18 | Cypriot First Division | 24 | 1 | 0 | 0 | 0 | 0 | 0 | 0 | 24 | 1 |
| Beroe | 2018–19 | First League | 9 | 0 | 1 | 0 | 0 | 0 | 0 | 0 | 10 | 0 |
| Hebar | 2019–20 | Second League | 9 | 0 | 0 | 0 | 0 | 0 | 0 | 0 | 9 | 0 |
| Career total | | | 269 | 29 | 33 | 2 | 2 | 1 | 25 | 4 | 329 | 36 |

=== National team ===
Appearances and goals by national team and year
| National team | Year | Apps | Goals |
|---|---|---|---|
Bulgaria
| Bulgaria | 2010 | 1 | 0 |
| Bulgaria | 2011 | 4 | 0 |
| Bulgaria | 2012 | 7 | 0 |
| Bulgaria | 2013 | 9 | 0 |
| Bulgaria | 2014 | 1 | 1 |
| Total | | 22 | 1 |

Bulgaria score listed first, score column indicates score after each Gadzhev goal

=== International goals ===
List of international goals scored by Vladimir Gadzhev
| # | Date | Venue | Opponent | Score | Result | Competition |
|---|---|---|---|---|---|---|
| 1. | 5 March 2014 | Vasil Levski National Stadium, Sofia, Bulgaria | Belarus | 2–0 | 2–1 | Friendly |

== Honours ==
- A Group: 2008–09
- Bulgarian Supercup: 2009

Coventry City

- EFL Trophy: 2016–17
