= List of New Testament lectionaries (1501–2000) =

A New Testament Lectionary is a handwritten copy of a lectionary, or book of New Testament Bible readings. Lectionaries may be written in majuscule or minuscule Greek letters, on parchment, papyrus, vellum, or paper.

Lectionaries which have the Gospels readings are called Evangeliaria or Evangelistaria, those which have the Acts or Epistles, Apostoli or Praxapostoli. They appear from the 6th century.

Gregory in 1909 enumerated 2234 lectionaries. To the present day 2484 lectionary manuscripts have been catalogued by the (INTF) in Münster.

Below is the list of lectionary 1501 to 2000. For other related lists, see:

- List of New Testament lectionaries
- List of New Testament lectionaries (1–500)
- List of New Testament lectionaries (501–1000)
- List of New Testament lectionaries (1001–1500)

== Legend ==
- The numbers (#) are the now standard system of Caspar René Gregory (Gregory–Aland).
- Dates are estimated to the nearest century (except lectionaries dated by scribes which are shown in the Date column).
- Content only the Gospel lessons (Evangelistarion), and other lessons from the rest of the NT apart from Revelation (Apostolos). Sometimes the surviving portion of a codex is so limited that specific books, chapters or even verses can be indicated. Linked articles, where they exist, generally specify content in detail, by verse.
- Digital images are referenced with direct links to the hosting web pages. The quality and accessibility of the images is as follows:

Gold color indicates high resolution color images available online.
Tan color indicates high resolution color images available locally, not online.
Light tan color indicates only a small fraction of manuscript pages with color images available online.
Light gray color indicates black/white or microfilm images available online.
Light blue color indicates manuscript not imaged, and is currently lost or ownership unknown.
Light pink color indicates manuscript destroyed, presumed destroyed, or deemed too fragile to digitize.
Violet color indicates high resolution ultraviolet images available online.

Contents Legend:
† Indicates the manuscript has damaged or missing pages.
^{P} Indicates only a portion of the original book remains.
^{K} Indicates manuscript also includes commentary notes.
^{sel} Indicates contents include Scripture readings for selected days only.
^{e} Indicates contents include weekday Scripture readings.
^{esk} Indicates contents include weekday Scripture readings from Easter to Pentecost and Saturday/Sunday readings for other weeks.
^{sk} Indicates contents include only Saturday and Sunday Scripture readings.
^{Lit} Indicates Liturgical book containing an assortment of New Testament texts.
^{PsO} Indicates a Psalter with Biblical Odes.
[ ] Brackets around Gregory-Aland number indicate the number is no longer is use.

Script Legend:
ΑΩ indicates Majuscule script
αω indicates Minuscule script
P^{U} indicates manuscript is a palimpsest and script is the text under the later script.
P^{O} indicates manuscript is a palimpsest and script is the text over the prior script.

== List of named or notable lectionaries ==
=== Lectionaries 1501–1600 ===
#	Date	Contents	Script	Pages	Institution	City, State	Country	Images
ℓ 1501	12th	Gospels^{P}	αω	8	Vernadsky National Library, F. V (00ID), Nr. 3621	Kyiv	Ukraine	
[ℓ 1502]								
ℓ 1503	16th	†Gospels^{e}	αω	287	Agion Theodoron Monastery, 3	Kalavryta	Greece	
ℓ 1504	11th	†Apostles^{esk}	αω P^{U}	149	Vatican Library, Barb. gr. 346, fol. 2-47.96-198	Vatican City	Vatican City	
ℓ 1505	11th	Apostles^{e}	αω	123	Vatican Library, Barb. gr. 501	Vatican City	Vatican City	
ℓ 1506	12th	†Apostles^{esk}	αω	107	Lincoln College, Gr. 4	Oxford	United Kingdom	
ℓ 1507	17th	Gospels + Apostles^{Lit}	αω	282	National Library of Greece, NLG 668	Athens	Greece	CSNTM
[ℓ 1508]								
ℓ 1509	17th	Apostles^{Lit}	αω	326	National Library of Greece, NLG 700	Athens	Greece	CSNTM
ℓ 1510	17th	Gospels + Apostles^{Lit}	αω	131	National Library of Greece, NLG 707	Athens	Greece	CSNTM
ℓ 1511	17th	Gospels + Apostles^{Lit}	αω	117	National Library of Greece, NLG 750	Athens	Greece	CSNTM
ℓ 1512	1525	Gospels + Apostles^{Lit}	αω	120	National Library of Greece, NLG 757	Athens	Greece	CSNTM
ℓ 1513	16th	Gospels + Apostles^{Lit}	αω	129	National Library of Greece, NLG 759	Athens	Greece	CSNTM
ℓ 1514	17th	Gospels + Apostles^{Lit}	αω	262	National Library of Greece, NLG 760	Athens	Greece	CSNTM
ℓ 1515	1588	Gospels + Apostles^{Lit}	αω	134	National Library of Greece, NLG 766	Athens	Greece	CSNTM
ℓ 1516	15th	Gospels + Apostles^{Lit}	αω	175	National Library of Greece, NLG 769	Athens	Greece	CSNTM
ℓ 1517	1572	†Gospels + Apostles^{Lit}	αω	36	National Library of Greece, NLG 784	Athens	Greece	CSNTM
ℓ 1518	17th	†Gospels + Apostles^{Lit}	αω	48	National Library of Greece, NLG786	Athens	Greece	CSNTM
ℓ 1519	16th	Gospels + Apostles^{Lit}	αω	495	National Library of Greece, NLG 798	Athens	Greece	CSNTM
[ℓ 1520]								
ℓ 1521	15th	Gospels^{esk}	αω P^{O}	145	National Library of Greece, NLG 78	Athens	Greece	CSNTM
ℓ 1522	12th	†Gospels^{e}	αω	135	National Library of Greece, NLG 97	Athens	Greece	CSNTM
ℓ 1523	1277	Gospels^{esk}	αω	173	National Library of Greece, NLG 104	Athens	Greece	CSNTM
ℓ 1524	1522	†Gospels^{esk}	αω	242	National Library of Greece, NLG 143	Athens	Greece	CSNTM
ℓ 1525	12th	Gospels^{esk}	αω	255	National Library of Greece, NLG 147	Athens	Greece	CSNTM
ℓ 1526	13th	†Gospels^{e}	αω	104	National Library of Greece, NLG 148	Athens	Greece	CSNTM
ℓ 1527	10th	Gospels^{PsO-K}	αω	345	National Library of Greece, NLG 1	Athens	Greece	CSNTM
ℓ 1528	1464	Gospels^{esk}	αω	236	National Library of Greece, NLG 1905	Athens	Greece	CSNTM
ℓ 1529	1288	Gospels^{e}	αω	231	National Library of Greece, NLG 2803	Athens	Greece	CSNTM
ℓ 1530	11th	Gospels^{e}	αω	370	National Library of Greece, NLG 2804	Athens	Greece	CSNTM
ℓ 1531	13th	Gospels + Apostles^{Lit}	αω	277	Monastery of Saint John the Theologian, 104	Patmos	Greece	
ℓ 1532	13th	Gospels + Apostles^{Lit}	αω	130	Monastery of Saint John the Theologian, 105	Patmos	Greece	
ℓ 1533	10th	Gospels^{P}	ΑΩ	87	National Library of Greece, NLG 60	Athens	Greece	CSNTM
ℓ 1534	14th	Gospels^{esk}	αω	208	Clare College, G. 3.9	Cambridge	United Kingdom	CSNTM
ℓ 1535	14th	Gospels^{P}	αω	27	Vatopedi Monastery, 247, fol. 326-352 (fol. 1-325: 1535)	Mount Athos	Greece	
ℓ 1536	13th	†Gospels^{e}	αω	347	Lutheran School of Theology at Chicago, Ms. Gruber 52	Chicago, IL	United States	CSNTM
ℓ 1537	15th	Gospels + Apostles^{Lit}	αω	192	Monastery of Saint John the Theologian, 690	Patmos	Greece	
ℓ 1538	15th	Gospels + Apostles^{Lit}	αω	357	Monastery of Saint John the Theologian, 703	Patmos	Greece	
ℓ 1539	1444	Gospels^{e}	αω	217	Monastery of Saint John the Theologian, 808	Patmos	Greece	
ℓ 1540	1297	Gospels^{e}	αω	232	Monastery of Saint John the Theologian, 790	Patmos	Greece	
ℓ 1541	13th	Gospels^{P}	αω	4	National Library, Supplement Grec 1257, fol. 168-171"	Paris	France	BnF
ℓ 1542	17th	Gospels + Apostles^{Lit}	αω	143	Byzantine and Christian Museum, 35	Athens	Greece	
[ℓ 1543]								
[ℓ 1544]								
[ℓ 1545]								
ℓ 1546	11th	Gospels^{Lit}	αω	?	Owner Unknown			
ℓ 1547	13th	Gospels^{P}	αω	18	Southern Methodist University Bridwell Library, BRMS 12	Dallas, TX	United States	CSNTM
ℓ 1548	13th	Apostles^{P}	αω	10	Konstamonitou Monastery, 106	Mount Athos	Greece	INTF
ℓ 1549	14th	†Gospels^{k-K}	αω	154	National Library of Greece, NLG 1914	Athens	Greece	CSNTM
ℓ 1550	1618	Gospels^{k-KP}	αω	2	Russian National Library, Gr. 408	Saint Petersburg	Russia	
ℓ 1551	11th	Apostles^{P}	αω	101	Saxon State Library, A 104, fol. 1-36.122-186	Dresden	Germany	INTF
ℓ 1552	10th	Gospels^{e}	αω	303	Russian National Library, Ф. № 573/ Б I 5 fol. 1-303	Saint Petersburg	Russia	INTF
ℓ 1553	9th	Gospels^{P}	ΑΩ	2	Docheiariou Monastery, 13, fol. 1 u. 272	Mount Athos	Greece	
ℓ 1554	12th	†Gospels^{esk}	αω	210	Owner Unknown			
ℓ 1555	13th	Apostles^{P}	αω	6	University of Chicago Library, Ms. 50 (Goodspeed)	Chicago, IL	United States	TUOCL
ℓ 1556	12th	Gospels + Apostles^{Lit}	αω	319	Vatopedi Monastery, 625	Mount Athos	Greece	
ℓ 1557	12th	Apostles^{P}	αω	151	Vatopedi Monastery, 1083	Mount Athos	Greece	
ℓ 1558	16th	Apostles^{Lit}	αω	60	Church of Protaton, 70	Mount Athos	Greece	
ℓ 1559	16th	Gospels + Apostles^{Lit}	αω	77	Church of Protaton, 73	Mount Athos	Greece	
ℓ 1560	15th	Gospels + Apostles^{Lit}	αω	125	Patriarchate of Jerusalem, Saba 56	Jerusalem	Israel	
[ℓ 1561]=0250								
ℓ 1562	12th	†Gospels^{esk}	αω	24	Williams College, Chapin Library, De Ricci 2	Williamstown, MA	United States	
ℓ 1562	12th	†Gospels^{esk}	αω	60	Columbia University, Plimpton MS 2	New York, NY	United States	CU
ℓ 1563	13th	†Gospels^{esk}	αω	236	Amherst College, Vault MS .L4	Amherst, MA	United States	AC
ℓ 1564	12th	Gospels^{P}	αω	33	Chicago Theological Seminary Library, 2	Chicago, IL	United States	
[ℓ 1565]								
[ℓ 1566]								
[ℓ 1567]								
ℓ 1568	11th	Gospels^{P}	αω	3	Patriarchate of Jerusalem, Nea Syllogi 59	Jerusalem	Israel	
ℓ 1569	10th	Gospels^{P}	ΑΩ	8	Patriarchate of Jerusalem, Nea Syllogi 67	Jerusalem	Israel	
ℓ 1570	11th	Gospels^{P}	αω	4	Bavarian State Library, Cod. graec. 472, fol. 1-2, 372-373	Munich	Germany	BSB
ℓ 1571	9th	†Gospels^{esk}	ΑΩ	199	Fitzwilliam Museum, McLean Coll. 1	Cambridge	United Kingdom	
ℓ 1572	12th	†Gospels^{sk}	αω	176	Fitzwilliam Museum, McLean Coll. 2	Cambridge	United Kingdom	
ℓ 1573	13th	†Gospels^{e}	αω	165	Fitzwilliam Museum, McLean Coll. 4	Cambridge	United Kingdom	
[ℓ 1574]								
ℓ 1575	9th	1 Pet 2:7-8	ΑΩ	1	British Library, Or. 3579B (59)	London	United Kingdom	
ℓ 1575	9th	Titus 2:15-3:7	ΑΩ	1	Cambridge University Library, Or. 16 1699 Πx	London	United Kingdom	
ℓ 1575	9th	1 Corinthians 1:22-29	ΑΩ	2	National Library, Copt. 129,11, fol. 52-53	Paris	France	
ℓ 1575	9th	Acts 2:1-5	ΑΩ	1	Austrian National Library, Pap. K. 16	Vienna	Austria	CSNTM
ℓ 1575	9th	1 Peter 2:21-25, 5:1-5	ΑΩ	1	Austrian National Library, Pap. K. 17	Vienna	Austria	
[ℓ 1576]=ℓ 1575								
ℓ 1577	13th	Gospels^{P}	αω	2	University of Michigan Library, Ms. 6	Ann Arbor, MI	United States	CSNTM
ℓ 1578	14th	†Gospels^{e}	αω	154	University of Michigan Library, Ms. 9	Ann Arbor, MI	United States	CSNTM
ℓ 1579	14th	†Gospels^{e}	αω	259	University of Michigan Library, Ms. 97	Ann Arbor, MI	United States	CSNTM
ℓ 1580	16th	Gospels^{Lit}	αω	418	University of Michigan Library, Ms. 130	Ann Arbor, MI	United States	CSNTM
ℓ 1581	1520-1570	Gospels + Apostles^{sel}	αω	202	Duke University, Greek MS 104	Durham, NC	United States	DU
ℓ 1582	12th	Matthew 26:27-39; Luke 22:43-45	αω	?	British Library, Add MS 19732	London	United Kingdom	
ℓ 1583	16th	Gospels	αω	199	Owner Unknown			
ℓ 1584	15th	Matthew 26:12-20; John 13:3-15	αω	1	University of Kansas, Kenneth Spencer Research Library, MS 9/2:24	Lawrence, KS	United States	UoCB
ℓ 1585	13th	Luke 18:35-43; 17:3-10	αω	1	Yale University Library, Beinecke MS 521	New Haven, CT	United States	
ℓ 1586	1178	Apostles	αω	200	National Library, Suppl. Gr. 1387	Paris	France	BnF
ℓ 1587	12th/13th	Gospels	αω	241	The New York Public Library, Spencer Collection Greek 2	New York, NY	United States	
ℓ 1588	1550	Gospels	αω	16	Ecclesiastical Museum of Paphos, Metropolis 11	Paphos	Cyprus	
ℓ 1589	11th	John 20:14-18; 21:1-7	αω	1	University of Pennsylvania, Misc Mss Box 14 Folder 8	Philadelphia, PA	United States	UoP
ℓ 1590	13th	Apostles^{e}	αω	241	Saint Catherine's Monastery, Gr. 287	Sinai	Egypt	CSNTM
ℓ 1591	15th	Apostles^{e}	αω	338	Saint Catherine's Monastery, Gr. 294	Sinai	Egypt	CSNTM
ℓ 1592	15th	Apostles^{e}	αω	339	Saint Catherine's Monastery, Gr. 301	Sinai	Egypt	CSNTM
ℓ 1593	14th	Apostles^{e}	αω	291	Saint Catherine's Monastery, Gr. 1589	Sinai	Egypt	CSNTM
ℓ 1594	14th	Apostles^{e}	αω	368	Saint Catherine's Monastery, Gr. 1590	Sinai	Egypt	CSNTM
ℓ 1595	1563	Apostles^{e}	αω	339	Saint Catherine's Monastery, Gr. 1592	Sinai	Egypt	CSNTM
ℓ 1596	10th/11th	Luke 22:1-19	αω	1	National Library, Dept. of Special Collections, 28529	Bucharest	Romania	INTF
[ℓ 1597]								
ℓ 1598	10th	Gospels^{P}	ΑΩ	Frg	University of Chicago Library, Ms. 702 (Goodspeed)	Chicago, IL	United States	TUOCL
ℓ 1599	10th/11th	†Gospels^{esk}	ΑΩ	145	University of Chicago Library, Ms. 128 (Goodspeed)	Chicago, IL	United States	TUOCL
ℓ 1600	15th	Gospels + Apostles^{Lit}	αω	332	University of Chicago Library, Ms. 166 (Goodspeed)	Chicago, IL	United States	TUOCL

[top]

=== Lectionaries 1601–1700 ===
#	Date	Contents	Script	Pages	Institution	City, State	Country	Images
ℓ 1601	5th	Gospels^{P}	ΑΩ P^{U}	2	British Library, Or. 4717 (5)	London	United Kingdom	
ℓ 1602	8th	†Gospels	ΑΩ	82	Morgan Library & Museum, MS M. 615	New York, NY	United States	INTF
ℓ 1602	8th	†Gospels	ΑΩ	1	University of Michigan, Inv. Nr. 4942	Ann Arbor, MI	United States	CSNTM
ℓ 1602	8th	†Gospels	ΑΩ	5	University Library, 615	Freiburg	Germany	INTF
ℓ 1603	12th	Gospels^{P}	ΑΩ	10	British Library, Or. 6801, fol. 22a- 31a	London	United Kingdom	
ℓ 1604	4th	Matthew 7:28; 8:7-9	ΑΩ	1	Bodleian Library, Copt. f. 5 (P)	Oxford	United Kingdom	INTF
ℓ 1605	13th	Gospels^{P}	ΑΩ	1	Bodleian Library, Copt. c. 3, 1 fol.	Oxford	United Kingdom	
ℓ 1605	13th	Gospels^{P}	ΑΩ	1	State and University Library, Lekt. 1	Hamburg	Germany	
ℓ 1605	13th	Gospels^{P}	ΑΩ	1	Austrian National Library, Pap. K 11346	Vienna	Austria	CSNTM
ℓ 1605	13th	Gospels^{P}	ΑΩ	3	British Library, Or. 1242,6	London	United Kingdom	
ℓ 1606	9th	Gospels^{P}	ΑΩ	5	National Library, Copt. 129, 7, fol. 5; 19, fol. 99; 21, fol. 9; 2, fol. 100; 1, fol. 89	Paris	France	
[ℓ 1607]								
ℓ 1608	11th	†Gospels^{esk}	αω	133	Topkapi Palace Museum, 114	Istanbul	Turkey	
ℓ 1609	12th	Gospels + Apostles^{P}	αω	1	University of Chicago Library, Ms. 142 (Goodspeed)	Chicago, IL	United States	TUOCL
ℓ 1610	15th	Gospels^{P}	αω	8	University of Michigan Library, Ms. 7	Ann Arbor, MI	United States	CSNTM
ℓ 1611	14th	Gospels + Apostles^{Lit}	αω P^{O}	221	University of Michigan Library, Ms. 8	Ann Arbor, MI	United States	CSNTM
ℓ 1612	9th	Gospels^{P}	ΑΩ	Frg	University of Michigan Library, Ms. 13	Ann Arbor, MI	United States	
ℓ 1613	15th	†Gospels^{sk}	αω	99	University of Michigan Library, Ms. 76	Ann Arbor, MI	United States	CSNTM
[ℓ 1614]=ℓ 963								
ℓ 1615	13th	Gospels^{esk}	αω	272	University of Michigan Library, Ms. 133	Ann Arbor, MI	United States	CSNTM
ℓ 1616	13th	Gospels^{esk}	αω	182	University of Michigan Library, Ms. 171	Ann Arbor, MI	United States	CSNTM
ℓ 1617	14th	Gospels^{P}	αω	1	University of Michigan Library, Ms. 173d	Ann Arbor, MI	United States	CSNTM
ℓ 1618	14th	Gospels^{P}	αω	52	University of Michigan Library, Ms. 196	Ann Arbor, MI	United States	CSNTM
ℓ 1619	17th	Gospels^{e}	αω	312	Duke University, Greek MS 002	Durham, NC	United States	DU
ℓ 1620	17th	Gospels^{P}	αω	6	Princeton University The Art Museum, y1956-117	Princeton, NJ	United States	
ℓ 1621	13th	†Gospels^{esk}	αω	256	Princeton University Libraries, Garrett MS. 9	Princeton, NJ	United States	INTF
ℓ 1622	13th	†Gospels^{esk}	αω	228	Princeton University Libraries, Garrett MS. 10	Princeton, NJ	United States	
ℓ 1623	13th	†Gospels^{sk}	αω	96	Duke University, Greek MS 082	Durham, NC	United States	DU
ℓ 1624	13th	†Gospels^{sk}	αω	197	Lutheran School of Theology at Chicago, Ms. Gruber 53	Chicago, IL	United States	CSNTM
ℓ 1625	12th	†Gospels^{e}	αω	250	Lutheran School of Theology at Chicago, Ms. Gruber 56	Chicago, IL	United States	CSNTM
ℓ 1626	1186	†Gospels^{esk}	αω	98	Lutheran School of Theology at Chicago, Ms. Gruber 123	Chicago, IL	United States	CSNTM
ℓ 1627	11th	†Gospels^{esk}	αω	168	Lutheran School of Theology at Chicago, Ms. Gruber 124	Chicago, IL	United States	CSNTM
ℓ 1628	13th	Gospels^{P}	αω	8	Lutheran School of Theology at Chicago, Ms. Gruber 125	Chicago, IL	United States	CSNTM
ℓ 1629	10th	†Gospels^{esk}	ΑΩ	179	Walters Art Museum, Ms. W. 520	Baltimore, MD	United States	WAM
ℓ 1629	10th	†Gospels^{esk}	ΑΩ	1	National Library Cyril and Methodius, Gr. 002	Sofia	Bulgaria	
ℓ 1630	1324	Apostles^{P}	αω	35	Great Lavra Monastery, E' 117, fol. 196-230 (fol. 1-195: 1614)	Mount Athos	Greece	CSNTM
ℓ 1631	14th	Apostles^{P}	αω	48	Great Lavra Monastery, E' 179, fol. 192-239 (fol. 1-191: 1620)	Mount Athos	Greece	
ℓ 1632	13th	Gospels^{e}	αω	215	Morgan Library & Museum, MS M.423	New York, NY	United States	
ℓ 1633	14th	Gospels^{P}	αω	44	Great Lavra Monastery, W' 118, fol. 207-250 (fol. 1-206: 1633)	Mount Athos	Greece	
ℓ 1634	11th	Gospels^{esk}	αω	374	Morgan Library & Museum, MS M.647	New York, NY	United States	INTF
ℓ 1635	12th	Gospels^{esk}	αω	293	Morgan Library & Museum, MS M.692	New York, NY	United States	INTF
[ℓ 1636]								
ℓ 1637	9th	Gospels + Apostles^{P}	ΑΩ P^{U}	144	University of Michigan Library, Ms. 37	Ann Arbor, MI	United States	CSNTM
ℓ 1638	16th	Gospels + Apostles^{Lit}	αω	150	University of Michigan Library, Ms. 39	Ann Arbor, MI	United States	CSNTM
ℓ 1639	13th	†Gospels + Apostles^{Lit}	αω	130	University of Michigan Library, Ms. 69	Ann Arbor, MI	United States	CSNTM
ℓ 1640	16th	Gospels + Apostles^{Lit}	αω	177	University of Michigan Library, Ms. 99	Ann Arbor, MI	United States	CSNTM
ℓ 1641	1548	Gospels + Apostles^{Lit}	αω	258	University of Michigan Library, Ms. 100	Ann Arbor, MI	United States	CSNTM
ℓ 1642	13th	†Gospels^{e}	αω	188	University of Chicago Library, Ms. 715 (Goodspeed)	Chicago, IL	United States	TUOCL
ℓ 1643	12th	Gospels^{e}	αω	161	Yale University Library, Beinecke MS 1180	New Haven, CT	United States	YUL
ℓ 1644	12th	Gospels^{e}	αω	331	McGill University	Montreal	Canada	
ℓ 1645	10th	Gospels^{P}	ΑΩ	2	Smithsonian Institution, Freer Gallery of Art, F1909.1683	Washington, DC	United States	FGOA
ℓ 1646	10th	Gospels^{P}	ΑΩ	1	Smithsonian Institution, Freer Gallery of Art, F1909.154	Washington, DC	United States	FGOA
ℓ 1647	13th	Gospels^{P}	αω	1	Smithsonian Institution, Freer Gallery of Art, F1909.1684	Washington, DC	United States	FGOA
ℓ 1648	13th	†Gospels^{sk}	αω	100	Princeton University Libraries, Princeton MS. 5	Princeton, NJ	United States	
ℓ 1649	13th	†Gospels^{esk}	αω	148	National Library of Greece, NLG 2520	Athens	Greece	CSNTM
ℓ 1649	13th	†Gospels^{esk}	αω	148	National Library of Greece, NLG 2520	Athens	Greece	CSNTM
ℓ 1650	12th	†Gospels^{e}	αω	146	National Library of Greece, NLG 2166	Athens	Greece	CSNTM
ℓ 1651	12th	†Gospels^{e}	αω	77	National Library of Greece, NLG 2356	Athens	Greece	CSNTM
ℓ 1652	12th	Gospels^{esk}	αω	166	Byzantine and Christian Museum, 81	Athens	Greece	
ℓ 1653	12th	Gospels^{P}	αω	35	Byzantine and Christian Museum, 82	Athens	Greece	
[ℓ 1654]								
ℓ 1655	1070	Gospels^{e}	αω	245	Byzantine and Christian Museum, 140	Athens	Greece	
ℓ 1656	11th	†Gospels^{esk}	αω	197	Byzantine and Christian Museum, 141	Athens	Greece	
ℓ 1656	11th	†Gospels^{esk}	αω	13	P. Moraux	Berlin	Germany	
ℓ 1657	11th	†Gospels^{esk}	αω	336	Byzantine and Christian Museum, 145	Athens	Greece	
ℓ 1658	12th	†Gospels^{e}	αω	321	Byzantine and Christian Museum, 142	Athens	Greece	
ℓ 1659	12th	Gospels^{e}	αω	261	Byzantine and Christian Museum, 143	Athens	Greece	
ℓ 1660	12th	Gospels^{e}	αω	264	Byzantine and Christian Museum, 146	Athens	Greece	
ℓ 1661	10th	Gospels^{P}	ΑΩ	2	Russian National Library, Gr. 666	Saint Petersburg	Russia	
ℓ 1662	12th	Gospels^{esk}	αω	300	Austrian National Library, Suppl. gr. 128	Vienna	Austria	CSNTM
ℓ 1663	14th	†Gospels^{esk}	αω	110	University of Chicago Library, Ms. 879 (Goodspeed)	Chicago, IL	United States	TUOCL
ℓ 1663	14th	†Gospels^{esk}	αω	1	McGill University	Montreal	Canada	Brice Jones
ℓ 1663	14th	†Gospels^{esk}	αω	1	E. Krentz	St. Louis, MO	United States	CSNTM
ℓ 1664	12th	Apostles^{e}	αω	173	Byzantine and Christian Museum, BXM 131	Athens	Greece	CSNTM
ℓ 1665	9th	Gospels^{P}	ΑΩ	2	Byzantine and Christian Museum, Frg. 1. 2	Athens	Greece	
ℓ 1666	9th	Gospels^{P}	ΑΩ	2	Byzantine and Christian Museum, BXM Frag 3; BXM 19922	Athens	Greece	CSNTM
ℓ 1667	13th	Apostles^{P}	αω	28	Vatopedi Monastery, 978, fol. 1. 2. 215-240 (fol. 3-214: 1605)	Mount Athos	Greece	CSNTM
ℓ 1668	14th	†Gospels^{esk}	αω	234	National Library, Supplement Grec 1331	Paris	France	BnF
ℓ 1669	14th	†Gospels^{esk}	αω	179	National Library, Supplement Grec 1368	Paris	France	BnF
ℓ 1670	15th	Apostles^{P}	αω	9	National Library, Supplement Grec 1370	Paris	France	
ℓ 1671	13th	Gospels + Apostles	αω P^{O}	193	Yale University Library, Beinecke MS 187	New Haven, CT	United States	
ℓ 1672	12th	John 12:36-47	αω	1	Owner Unknown			
ℓ 1673	13th	Gospels^{P}	αω	2	Union Presbyterian Seminary	Richmond, VA	United States	
[ℓ 1674]								
ℓ 1675	13th	Gospels^{P}	αω	1	Bodleian Library, Gr. bib. d. 9	Oxford	United Kingdom	
ℓ 1675	13th	Gospels^{P}	αω	1	H.R. Willoughby, Ms. 3	Chicago, IL	United States	
ℓ 1676	16th	Gospels^{esk}	αω	325	Public Historical Library of Zagora, 4	Zagora	Greece	CSNTM
[ℓ 1677]								
[ℓ 1678]								
[ℓ 1679]								
ℓ 1680	12th	Gospels^{P}	αω	26	State Archives, Ms 168,3	Athens	Greece	
ℓ 1681	15th	Gospels^{esk}	αω	186	Bible Museum, MS 12	Münster	Germany	CSNTM
ℓ 1682	16th	†Gospels^{esk}	αω	131	Bible Museum, MS 14	Münster	Germany	CSNTM
ℓ 1683	13th	†Gospels^{e}	αω	241	Bible Museum, MS 15	Münster	Germany	CSNTM
ℓ 1684	1247	†Gospels^{esk}	αω P^{O}	166	Bible Museum, MS 1	Münster	Germany	CSNTM
ℓ 1685	15th	†Gospels + Apostles^{e}	αω	263	Bible Museum, MS 16	Münster	Germany	CSNTM
ℓ 1686	16th	Gospels + Apostles^{Lit}	αω	184	Bible Museum, MS 13	Münster	Germany	CSNTM
ℓ 1687	8th	Gospels^{P}	ΑΩ P^{U}	3	National Historical Museum, Hist. Eth. Ges. 201	Athens	Greece	CSNTM
ℓ 1688	9th	Gospels^{P}	αω	2	National Historical Museum, 264	Athens	Greece	CSNTM
ℓ 1689	1529	Apostles^{e}	αω	177	Vatopedi Monastery, 868	Mount Athos	Greece	
ℓ 1690	13th	Gospels^{e}	αω	212	Vatopedi Monastery 892	Mount Athos	Greece	
ℓ 1691	17th	Gospels^{e}	αω	218	Vatopedi Monastery, 977	Mount Athos	Greece	
ℓ 1692	11th	†Gospels^{sel}	αω	175	Dionysiou Monastery, 656	Mount Athos	Greece	INTF
ℓ 1693	1201	Gospels^{esk}	αω	205	Dionysiou Monastery, 724	Mount Athos	Greece	
ℓ 1694	12th/13th	†Gospels^{e}	αω	197	Church of the Dormition of the Virgin	Vitsa	Greece	
ℓ 1695	12th	Gospels	αω	295	Owner Unknown			
ℓ 1696	11th	†Gospels	αω	130	Archaeological Museum of Almyros, 1?	Almyros	Greece	
ℓ 1697	12th	†Gospels^{esk}	αω	229	Archimandrius Monastery, 1	Ioannina	Greece	
ℓ 1698	12th	Gospels^{esk}	αω	228	Archimandrius Monastery, 6, 7 & 8	Ioannina	Greece	
[ℓ 1699]								
[ℓ 1700]								

[top]

=== Lectionaries 1701–1800 ===
#	Date	Contents	Script	Pages	Institution	City, State	Country	Images
ℓ 1701	14th	Gospels^{esk}	αω	138	Archimandrius Monastery, 10	Ioannina	Greece	
ℓ 1702	12th	†Gospels^{e}	αω	302	Archimandrius Monastery, 11	Ioannina	Greece	
ℓ 1703	12th	†Gospels^{e}	αω	290	Archimandrius Monastery, 12	Ioannina	Greece	
ℓ 1704	1549	Gospels^{e}	αω	446	Archimandrius Monastery, 13	Ioannina	Greece	INTF
ℓ 1705	1292	Gospels^{esk}	αω	188	Archimandrius Monastery, 14	Ioannina	Greece	
ℓ 1706	15th	Gospels^{esk}	αω	119	Archimandrius Monastery, 15	Ioannina	Greece	
ℓ 1707	1511	†Apostles^{e}	αω	145	Archimandrius Monastery, 17	Ioannina	Greece	
ℓ 1708	13th	†Gospels^{esk}	αω	177	Zosimaia School, 17	Ioannina	Greece	
ℓ 1709	16th	Gospels^{e}	αω	325	Metropolis Library, 1	Ioannina	Greece	
ℓ 1710	16th	†Gospels + Apostles	αω	123	Monastery of Agia Lavra	Kalavryta	Greece	
ℓ 1711	15th	Apostles^{Lit}	αω	524	Owner Unknown			
ℓ 1712	1558	Gospels^{e}	αω	447	Ecclesiastical Historical and Archival Institute of the Patriarchate of Bulgaria, EHAI 575	Sofia	Bulgaria	INTF
ℓ 1713	16th	†Gospels^{e}	αω	296	Ecclesiastical Historical and Archival Institute of the Patriarchate of Bulgaria, EHAI 394	Sofia	Bulgaria	
ℓ 1714	12th	†Gospels^{esk}	αω	61	Ecclesiastical Historical and Archival Institute of the Patriarchate of Bulgaria, EHAI 297	Sofia	Bulgaria	
ℓ 1715	13th	Apostles	αω	276	Owner Unknown			
ℓ 1716	13th/ 14th	†Gospels^{esk}	αω	137	Ecclesiastical Historical and Archival Institute of the Patriarchate of Bulgaria, EHAI 299	Sofia	Bulgaria	
ℓ 1717	14th	Gospels + Apostles^{sk}	αω	204	Ecclesiastical Historical and Archival Institute of the Patriarchate of Bulgaria, EHAI 313	Sofia	Bulgaria	
ℓ 1718	15th	†Apostles^{sk}	αω	165	Ecclesiastical Historical and Archival Institute of the Patriarchate of Bulgaria, EHAI 298	Sofia	Bulgaria	INTF
ℓ 1719	12th	†Gospels^{sk}	αω	95	Monastery of Saint John the Theologian, 769	Patmos	Greece	
ℓ 1720	1699	Gospels^{k}	αω	97	Panachrantos Monastery, 26	Andros	Greece	
ℓ 1721	1688	Gospels^{k}	αω	96	Greek Orthodox Patriarchate, 293	Alexandria	Egypt	
ℓ 1722	13th	†Gospels^{e}	αω	198	Patriarchate of Jerusalem, Stavru 110	Jerusalem	Israel	CSNTM
ℓ 1723	13th	Apostles^{P}	αω	1	Patriarchate of Jerusalem, Nea Syllogi 59	Jerusalem	Israel	
ℓ 1724	15th	†Gospels^{esk}	αω	152	National Library of Greece, Taphu 652	Athens	Greece	
ℓ 1725	16th	Apostles^{sk}	αω	122	National Library of Greece, Taphu 660, fol. 129-250	Athens	Greece	
ℓ 1726	11th	Apostles^{P}	αω	6	National Library of Greece, Taphu 853	Athens	Greece	
ℓ 1727	11th	Apostles^{P}	αω	2	National Library of Greece, Taphu 857,1	Athens	Greece	
ℓ 1728	16th	Gospels	αω	347	Owner Unknown			
ℓ 1729	10th	Gospels^{P}	ΑΩ	2	Russian State Library, Φ. 087 63 (gr. 167.1)	Moscow	Russia	
[ℓ 1730]								
ℓ 1731	9th	Gospels^{P}	ΑΩ	2 Frg	Russian National Library, Ф. № 536/ O 152	Saint Petersburg	Russia	
ℓ 1732	11th	†Gospels^{e}	αω	89	St. Cyril and Methodius National Library, Gr. 4	Sofia	Bulgaria	
ℓ 1733	13th/ 14th	Gospels + Apostles^{esk}	αω	114	St. Cyril and Methodius National Library, Gr. 13	Sofia	Bulgaria	
ℓ 1734	11th	Gospels^{P}	αω	1	St. Cyril and Methodius National Library, Gr. 5	Sofia	Bulgaria	
ℓ 1735	9th/10th	Gospels^{P}	ΑΩ	1	St. Cyril and Methodius National Library, Gr. 1	Sofia	Bulgaria	
[ℓ 1736]								
ℓ 1737	13th	†Gospels^{esk}	αω	227	Romanian Academy, Ms. Gr. 935	Bucharest	Romania	
ℓ 1738	14th	†Gospels^{esk}	αω	86	Romanian Academy, Ms. Gr. 936	Bucharest	Romania	
ℓ 1739	10th	Gospels^{P}	ΑΩ	1	Austrian National Library, Pap. K. 9730	Vienna	Austria	CSNTM
ℓ 1740	16th	Gospels + Apostles^{P}	αω	2	National Library, Ms. II. A. 36	Naples	Italy	
ℓ 1741	9th	Gospels^{P}	ΑΩ	1	British Library, Or. 3579B, fol. 30	London	United Kingdom	
ℓ 1741	9th	Gospels^{P}	ΑΩ	4	National Library, Copt. 129, 21, fol. 11-13; 9, fol. 96	Paris	France	
ℓ 1742	14th	Gospels^{sel}	αω	8	British Library, Add MS 39623	London	United Kingdom	BL
ℓ 1743	1256	Gospels^{esk}	αω	151	British Library, Add MS 40754	London	United Kingdom	BL
ℓ 1744	11th	Gospels^{e}	αω	280	National Library of Scotland, MS. 9000	Edinburgh	United Kingdom	
ℓ 1745	11th/12th	Gospels^{e}	αω	356	John Rylands University Library of Manchester, Gr. Ms. 15	Manchester	United Kingdom	
ℓ 1746	13th	Gospels + Apostles^{P}	ΑΩ	3	Bodleian Library, Gr. bib. e. 1	Oxford	United Kingdom	
ℓ 1747	11th	Gospels^{P}	ΑΩ	2	University Library, Ms. 235 (D Laing III 500)	Edinburgh	United Kingdom	CSNTM
ℓ 1748	11th	Gospels^{e}	αω	244	Royal Danish Library, NKS 2126, 2°	Copenhagen	Denmark	
ℓ 1749	15th	Gospels^{P}	αω	161	Saint Catherine's Monastery, Gr. 109	Sinai	Egypt	CSNTM
ℓ 1750	11th	Gospels^{e}	αω	340	Saint Catherine's Monastery, Gr. 205	Sinai	Egypt	CSNTM
ℓ 1751	1479	Gospels^{P}	αω	5	Great Lavra Monastery, K' 190, fol. 169-173 (fol. 1-168: 1751)	Mount Athos	Greece	CSNTM
ℓ 1752	13th	Gospels^{e}	αω	363	Saint Catherine's Monastery, Gr. 206	Sinai	Egypt	CSNTM
ℓ 1753	12th	Gospels^{e}	αω	339	Saint Catherine's Monastery, Gr. 207	Sinai	Egypt	CSNTM
ℓ 1754	12th	Gospels^{esk}	αω	254	Saint Catherine's Monastery, Gr. 208	Sinai	Egypt	CSNTM
ℓ 1755	12th	Gospels^{e}	αω	348	Saint Catherine's Monastery, Gr. 209	Sinai	Egypt	CSNTM
ℓ 1756	14th	Gospels^{e}	αω	296	Saint Catherine's Monastery, Gr. 238	Sinai	Egypt	CSNTM
ℓ 1757	1373	Gospels^{e}	αω	365	Saint Catherine's Monastery, Gr. 239	Sinai	Egypt	CSNTM
ℓ 1758	16th	Gospels^{e}	αω	449	Saint Catherine's Monastery, Gr. 246	Sinai	Egypt	CSNTM
ℓ 1759	15th	Gospels^{e}	αω	385	Saint Catherine's Monastery, Gr. 247	Sinai	Egypt	CSNTM
ℓ 1760	16th	Gospels^{e}	αω	272	Saint Catherine's Monastery, Gr. 248	Sinai	Egypt	
ℓ 1761	15th	Gospels^{e}	αω	189	Saint Catherine's Monastery, Gr. 249	Sinai	Egypt	CSNTM
ℓ 1762	15th	Gospels^{e}	αω	352	Saint Catherine's Monastery, Gr. 250	Sinai	Egypt	CSNTM
ℓ 1763	14th	Gospels^{e}	αω	337	Saint Catherine's Monastery, Gr. 1343	Sinai	Egypt	CSNTM
ℓ 1764	14th	Gospels + Apostles^{sel}	αω	250	Saint Catherine's Monastery, Gr. 1344	Sinai	Egypt	CSNTM
ℓ 1765	14th	Gospels^{e}	αω	239	Saint Catherine's Monastery, Gr. 1413	Sinai	Egypt	CSNTM
ℓ 1766	16th	Gospels + Apostles^{Lit}	αω	154	Saint Catherine's Monastery, Gr. 2037	Sinai	Egypt	CSNTM
ℓ 1767	1545	Apostles^{e}	αω	198	Saint Catherine's Monastery, Gr. 2049	Sinai	Egypt	CSNTM
ℓ 1768	17th	†Apostles^{e}	αω	361	Saint Catherine's Monastery, Gr. 2050	Sinai	Egypt	CSNTM
ℓ 1769	16th	Apostles^{esk}	αω	181	Saint Catherine's Monastery, Gr. 2052	Sinai	Egypt	CSNTM
ℓ 1770	14th	Gospels + Apostles^{sel}	αω	34	Saint Catherine's Monastery, Gr. 2053	Sinai	Egypt	CSNTM
ℓ 1771	12th	Gospels^{e}	αω	326	Saint Catherine's Monastery, Gr. 2090	Sinai	Egypt	CSNTM
ℓ 1772	15th	Gospels^{e}	αω	365	Saint Catherine's Monastery, Gr. 2254	Sinai	Egypt	CSNTM
ℓ 1773	13th	Gospels^{P}	αω	63	Saint Catherine's Monastery, Arab. 124, N.E. X 125. 424	Sinai	Egypt	CSNTM
ℓ 1774	13th	Apostles^{P}	αω	106	Saint Catherine's Monastery, Arab. 172	Sinai	Egypt	CSNTM
ℓ 1775	17th	Gospels^{e}	αω	285	Patriarchate of Jerusalem, Skevophylakion 2	Jerusalem	Israel	
ℓ 1776	11th	†Gospels	αω	193	Ecumenical Patriarchate, 1	Istanbul	Turkey	
ℓ 1777	12th	†Gospels	αω	120	Ecumenical Patriarchate, 2	Istanbul	Turkey	
ℓ 1778	12th	†Gospels^{esk}	αω	253	Ecumenical Patriarchate, Skevophylakion, 6	Istanbul	Turkey	
ℓ 1779	12th	†Gospels^{esk}	αω	421	Ecumenical Patriarchate, Skevophylakion, 7	Istanbul	Turkey	
ℓ 1780	12th	Gospels^{e}	αω	332	Ecumenical Patriarchate, Skevophylakion, 8	Istanbul	Turkey	INTF
ℓ 1781	12th	†Gospels^{esk}	αω	284	Ecumenical Patriarchate, Skevophylakion, 9	Istanbul	Turkey	
ℓ 1782	13th	Gospels^{e}	αω	235	Ecumenical Patriarchate, Skevophylakion, 10	Istanbul	Turkey	
ℓ 1783	13th	†Gospels^{e}	αω	251	Ecumenical Patriarchate, Chalki, Kamariotissis, 173	Istanbul	Turkey	
ℓ 1784	12th	Gospels^{esk}	αω	167	Ecumenical Patriarchate, Chalki, Kamariotissis, 174	Istanbul	Turkey	
ℓ 1785	13th	Gospels^{e}	αω	298	Ecumenical Patriarchate, Skevophylakion, 13	Istanbul	Turkey	
ℓ 1786	1551	Gospels^{e}	αω	369	Ecumenical Patriarchate, Skevophylakion, 14	Istanbul	Turkey	
ℓ 1787	16th	Gospels	αω	276	Ecumenical Patriarchate, Chalki, Kamariotissis, 168	Istanbul	Turkey	
ℓ 1788	11th	Gospels^{esk}	αω	264	National Library of Greece, Megalê tou Genous Scholê 02	Athens	Greece	INTF
ℓ 1789	1690	Gospels^{k}	αω	106	Great Lavra Monastery, ζ' 65	Mount Athos	Greece	
ℓ 1790	1400	Gospels + Apostles^{Lit}	αω	168	Iviron Monastery, 780	Mount Athos	Greece	
ℓ 1791	16th	Gospels	αω	320	Owner Unknown			
ℓ 1792	13th	Gospels^{esk}	αω	223	Byzantine and Christian Museum, BXM 19513	Athens	Greece	CSNTM
ℓ 1793	17th	†Gospels^{e}	αω	349	Byzantine and Christian Museum, 144	Athens	Greece	
ℓ 1794	14th	†Apostles^{esk}	αω	241	Byzantine and Christian Museum, 148	Athens	Greece	
ℓ 1795	16th	Gospels^{e}	αω	243	Byzantine and Christian Museum, 163	Athens	Greece	
ℓ 1796	1743	Gospels^{e}	αω	218	Byzantine and Christian Museum, 182	Athens	Greece	
ℓ 1797	16th	Gospels^{P}	αω	1	Byzantine and Christian Museum, Frg. 20	Athens	Greece	
ℓ 1798	13th	Gospels^{P}	αω	1	Byzantine and Christian Museum, Frg. 23	Athens	Greece	
ℓ 1799	16th	Gospels^{P}	αω	2	Byzantine and Christian Museum, Frg. 32	Athens	Greece	
ℓ 1800	12th	†Gospels^{e}	αω	265	National Library of Greece, NLG 2168	Athens	Greece	CSNTM

[top]

=== Lectionaries 1801–1900 ===
#	Date	Contents	Script	Pages	Institution	City, State	Country	Images
ℓ 1801	1265	Gospels^{esk}	αω	193	National Library of Greece, NLG 2189	Athens	Greece	CSNTM
ℓ 1802	1602	Gospels^{e}	αω	183	National Library of Greece, NLG 2268	Athens	Greece	CSNTM
ℓ 1803	14th	†Gospels^{e}	αω	236	National Library of Greece, NLG 2269	Athens	Greece	CSNTM
ℓ 1804	1356	†Gospels^{e}	αω	170	National Library of Greece, NLG 2359	Athens	Greece	CSNTM
ℓ 1805	12th	†Gospels^{sk}	αω	297	National Library of Greece, NLG 2363	Athens	Greece	CSNTM
ℓ 1806	1460	Gospels + Apostles^{Lit}	αω	547	National Library of Greece, NLG 2630	Athens	Greece	CSNTM
ℓ 1807	1454	Gospels^{e}	αω	254	National Library of Greece, NLG 2642	Athens	Greece	CSNTM
ℓ 1808	12th	Gospels^{esk}	αω	219	National Library of Greece, NLG 2645	Athens	Greece	CSNTM
ℓ 1809	12th	†Gospels^{esk}	αω	232	National Library of Greece, NLG 2646	Athens	Greece	CSNTM
ℓ 1810	1543	Gospels^{esk}	αω	253	National Library of Greece, NLG 2647	Athens	Greece	CSNTM
ℓ 1811	1491	Gospels + Apostles^{Lit}	αω	144	National Library of Greece, 2658	Athens	Greece	
ℓ 1812	1270	†Gospels^{esk}	αω	137	National Library of Greece, NLG 2672	Athens	Greece	CSNTM
ℓ 1813	12th	†Gospels^{esk}	αω	239	National Library of Greece, NLG 2676	Athens	Greece	CSNTM
ℓ 1813	12th	†Gospels^{esk}	αω	239	National Library of Greece, NLG 2676	Athens	Greece	CSNTM
ℓ 1814	1538	Gospels^{e}	αω	220	National Library of Greece, NLG 2680	Athens	Greece	CSNTM
ℓ 1815	15th	†Apostles^{e}	αω	172	National Library of Greece, NLG 2692	Athens	Greece	CSNTM
ℓ 1816	12th	†Gospels^{esk}	αω	154	National Library of Greece, NLG 2711	Athens	Greece	CSNTM
ℓ 1817	15th	†Gospels^{e}	αω	112	National Library of Greece, NLG 2713	Athens	Greece	CSNTM
ℓ 1818	16th	Apostles^{e}	αω	260	National Library of Greece, NLG 2726	Athens	Greece	CSNTM
ℓ 1819	17th	†Apostles^{esk}	αω	86	National Library of Greece, NLG 2737	Athens	Greece	CSNTM
ℓ 1820	14th	Apostles^{P}	αω	57	National Library of Greece, NLG 2744	Athens	Greece	CSNTM
ℓ 1821	14th	†Gospels^{e}	αω	278	National Library of Greece, NLG 2815	Athens	Greece	CSNTM
ℓ 1822	16th	Gospels^{sk}	αω	175	National Library of Greece, NLG 2864	Athens	Greece	
ℓ 1823	1563	Gospels^{e}	αω	468	National Library of Greece, NLG 2916	Athens	Greece	CSNTM
ℓ 1824	12th	†Gospels^{e}	αω	108	National Library of Greece, NLG 3028	Athens	Greece	CSNTM
ℓ 1825	16th	†Apostles^{e}	αω	117	National Library of Greece, NLG 3041	Athens	Greece	CSNTM
ℓ 1826	11th	†Gospels^{e}	αω	142	National Library of Greece, NLG 3062	Athens	Greece	CSNTM
ℓ 1826	11th	†Gospels^{e}	αω	142	National Library of Greece, NLG 3062	Athens	Greece	CSNTM
ℓ 1827	9th	Gospels^{P}	ΑΩ P^{O}	2	Russian State Library, Φ. 270 72 (gr. 168.1)	Moscow	Russia	
ℓ 1828	12th	Gospels^{P}	αω	5	Russian State Library, Φ. 270 72 (gr. 168.8)	Moscow	Russia	
ℓ 1829	13th	Gospels^{P}	αω	3	Russian State Library, Φ. 270 72 (gr. 168.9)	Moscow	Russia	
ℓ 1830	11th	Gospels^{P}	αω	1	Russian State Library, Φ. 270 71 (gr. 169.1)	Moscow	Russia	
ℓ 1831	11th	Gospels^{P}	αω	2	Russian State Library, Φ. 270 71 (Gr. 169.2)	Moscow	Russia	
ℓ 1832	11th	Gospels^{P}	αω	1	Russian State Library, Φ. 270 71 (gr. 169.3)	Moscow	Russia	
ℓ 1833	11th	Gospels^{P}	αω	2	Russian State Library, Φ. 270 71 (gr. 169.4), Φ. 270 74 (gr. 171.2)	Moscow	Russia	
ℓ 1834	12th	Gospels^{P}	αω	1	Russian State Library, Φ. 270 74 (gr. 171.4)	Moscow	Russia	
ℓ 1835	12th	Gospels^{P}	αω	2	Russian State Library, Φ. 270 75 (gr. 172.5)	Moscow	Russia	
ℓ 1836	9th	Gospels^{P}	ΑΩ P^{U}	3	National Library, Coislin Grec 211, fol. 1, 351-352	Paris	France	
ℓ 1837	8th	Gospels^{P}	ΑΩ P^{U}	2	National Library, Supplement Grec 1232, fol. 1-2	Paris	France	BnF
ℓ 1838	11th	Gospels^{P}	αω	2	Trinity College, B.17.20 (fol. 170r-174r)	Cambridge	United Kingdom	TC
ℓ 1839	11th	Gospels^{e}	αω	267	Duke University, Greek MS 065	Durham, NC	United States	DU
ℓ 1840	15th	Gospels^{esk}	αω	212	Owner Unknown			
ℓ 1841	12th	†Gospels^{e}	αω	269	Russian Academy of Sciences Historical Institute, RAIK 068	Saint Petersburg	Russia	
ℓ 1842	14th	†Gospels^{e}	αω	138	Russian Academy of Sciences Historical Institute, RAIK 071	Saint Petersburg	Russia	
ℓ 1843	11th	†Gospels^{esk}	αω	44	Russian Academy of Sciences Historical Institute, RAIK 075	Saint Petersburg	Russia	
ℓ 1844	14th	Gospels + Apostles^{e}	αω	255	Russian Academy of Sciences Historical Institute, RAIK 087	Saint Petersburg	Russia	
ℓ 1845	11th	Gospels^{P}	αω	1	Russian Academy of Sciences Historical Institute, RAIK 093	Saint Petersburg	Russia	
ℓ 1846	11th/12th	Gospels^{P}	αω	16	Russian Academy of Sciences Historical Institute, RAIK 193	Saint Petersburg	Russia	
ℓ 1847	11th	Gospels^{e}	αω	309	Institute of Oriental Manuscripts, Д 227	Saint Petersburg	Russia	
ℓ 1848	14th	Gospels^{P}	αω	2	Russian National Library, Gr. 534 I	Saint Petersburg	Russia	
ℓ 1849	9th	Gospels^{P}	ΑΩ P^{U}	1	Russian National Library, Gr. 566	Saint Petersburg	Russia	
ℓ 1850	12th	Gospels^{P}	αω	1	Russian National Library, Gr. 637	Saint Petersburg	Russia	
ℓ 1851	12th	Gospels^{P}	αω	1	Russian National Library, Gr. 638	Saint Petersburg	Russia	
ℓ 1852	13th	†Gospels^{sk}	αω	119	Russian National Library, Gr. 669, fol. 66-184	Saint Petersburg	Russia	
ℓ 1853	12th	Gospels^{e}	αω	268	Russian National Library, Gr. 670	Saint Petersburg	Russia	
ℓ 1854	14th	Gospels^{P}	αω P^{O}	4?	Russian National Library, Gr. 679, Gr. 767	Saint Petersburg	Russia	
ℓ 1855	9th	Apostles^{P}	ΑΩ	2	Russian National Library, Gr. 775	Saint Petersburg	Russia	
ℓ 1856	13th	Gospels + Apostles^{P}	αω P^{O}	10	Russian National Library, Gr. 766	Saint Petersburg	Russia	
ℓ 1857	11th	Gospels^{P}	αω	3	Russian National Library, Gr. 800	Saint Petersburg	Russia	
ℓ 1858	12th	†Gospels^{esk}	αω	248	State Historical Museum, Mus. sobr. 3645	Moscow	Russia	
ℓ 1859	12th	Gospels^{esk}	αω	260	State Historical Museum, Mus. sobr. 3647	Moscow	Russia	
ℓ 1860	11th	Gospels^{P}	αω	8	Russian State Library, Φ. 270 74 (gr. 171.1 )	Moscow	Russia	
ℓ 1861	14th	Apostles^{P}	αω	1	Vernadsky National Library, F. 301 (KDA), 24p	Kyiv	Ukraine	
ℓ 1862	11th	Gospels^{e}	αω	246	Vernadsky National Library, F. 301 (KDA), 15p	Kyiv	Ukraine	
ℓ 1863	11th	†Gospels^{e}	αω	329	Vernadsky National Library, F. 310 (Samml. Nejin), 150	Kyiv	Ukraine	
ℓ 1864	12th	Gospels + Apostles^{P}	αω	2	Vernadsky National Library, F. V (OOID), No. 3622	Kyiv	Ukraine	
ℓ 1865	14th	Gospels^{P}	αω	38	Odesa National Scientific Library, 441	Odesa	Ukraine	
ℓ 1866	10th	Gospels^{P}	ΑΩ	13	Odesa National Scientific Library, 552.1	Odesa	Ukraine	
ℓ 1867	10th	Gospels^{P}	ΑΩ	2	Odesa National Scientific Library, 552.2	Odesa	Ukraine	
ℓ 1868	12th	Gospels^{P}	αω	1	Odesa National Scientific Library, 552.3	Odesa	Ukraine	
ℓ 1869	13th	Gospels^{P}	αω	1	Odesa National Scientific Library, 552.4	Odesa	Ukraine	
ℓ 1870	10th	Gospels^{P}	ΑΩ	1	Mesrop Mashtots Institute of Ancient Manuscripts, 612, fol. 1	Yerevan	Armenia	
ℓ 1871	11th	Gospels^{P}	αω	6	Mesrop Mashtots Institute of Ancient Manuscripts, 1049, 1297	Yerevan	Armenia	
ℓ 1872	12th	Gospels^{P}	αω	1	Mesrop Mashtots Institute of Ancient Manuscripts, 1190, fol. 1	Yerevan	Armenia	
ℓ 1873	12th	Gospels^{P}	αω	1	Mesrop Mashtots Institute of Ancient Manuscripts, 1547, fol. 1	Yerevan	Armenia	
ℓ 1874	13th	Gospels^{P}	αω	2	Mesrop Mashtots Institute of Ancient Manuscripts, 1624	Yerevan	Armenia	
ℓ 1875	14th	Gospels^{P}	αω	2	Mesrop Mashtots Institute of Ancient Manuscripts, 2164	Yerevan	Armenia	INTF
ℓ 1876	13th	Gospels^{P}	αω	1	Mesrop Mashtots Institute of Ancient Manuscripts, 2274	Yerevan	Armenia	INTF
ℓ 1877	13th	Gospels^{P}	αω	2	Mesrop Mashtots Institute of Ancient Manuscripts, 3461	Yerevan	Armenia	INTF
ℓ 1878	14th	Gospels^{P}	αω	2	Mesrop Mashtots Institute of Ancient Manuscripts, 6953	Yerevan	Armenia	INTF
ℓ 1879	13th	Gospels^{P}	αω	2	Mesrop Mashtots Institute of Ancient Manuscripts, 8482	Yerevan	Armenia	INTF
ℓ 1880	14th	Gospels^{P}	αω	1	Mesrop Mashtots Institute of Ancient Manuscripts, Frg. 1	Yerevan	Armenia	
ℓ 1881	13th	Gospels^{P}	αω	4	Mesrop Mashtots Institute of Ancient Manuscripts, Frg. 7, 9	Yerevan	Armenia	
[ℓ 1882]								
ℓ 1883	11th/12th	Gospels^{P}	αω	4	St. Cyril and Methodius National Library, Gr. 6	Sofia	Bulgaria	
ℓ 1884	12th	Gospels^{P}	αω	10	St. Cyril and Methodius National Library, Gr. 9	Sofia	Bulgaria	
ℓ 1885	9th	Gospels^{P}	ΑΩ P^{U}	29	National Library of Greece, NLG 2106, fol. 31, 36, 38-47, 54, 185-186, 217, 242-254	Athens	Greece	CSNTM
ℓ 1885	9th	Gospels^{P}	ΑΩ P^{U}	29	National Library of Greece, NLG 2106, fol. 31, 36, 38-47, 54, 185-186, 217, 242-254	Athens	Greece	CSNTM
ℓ 1886	13th/ 14th	Gospels^{esk}	αω	197	Benaki Museum, MS 63/34783	Athens	Greece	CSNTM
ℓ 1887	10th/11th	Gospels^{esk}	αω	171	Benaki Museum, TA 138	Athens	Greece	CSNTM
ℓ 1888	11th/12th	Gospels^{esk}	αω	222	Benaki Museum, TA 140	Athens	Greece	CSNTM
[ℓ 1889]								
ℓ 1890	12th/ 13th	†Gospels^{esk}	αω	162	Benaki Museum, TA 145	Athens	Greece	CSNTM
[ℓ 1891]								
ℓ 1892	11th-13th	Gospels	αω P^{U}	199	Benaki Museum, TA 147	Athens	Greece	CSNTM
[ℓ 1893]								
ℓ 1894	14th	†Apostles^{e}	αω	322	Benaki Museum, TA 271	Athens	Greece	CSNTM
ℓ 1895	13th	Gospels^{P}	αω	61	State Archives, K 47.VI.63	Athens	Greece	
ℓ 1896	13th	Apostles^{P}	αω	4	Vatopedi Monastery, 1219, fol. 15-18	Mount Athos	Greece	CSNTM
ℓ 1897	12th	Gospels^{P}	αω	2	Vatopedi Monastery, 1219, fol. 21.22	Mount Athos	Greece	CSNTM
ℓ 1898	12th	Gospels^{P}	αω	2	Vatopedi Monastery, 1219, fol. 26.27	Mount Athos	Greece	CSNTM
ℓ 1899	13th	Gospels^{P}	αω	2	Vatopedi Monastery, 1219, fol. 28.29	Mount Athos	Greece	CSNTM
ℓ 1900	14th	Gospels + Apostles^{P}	αω	7	Vatopedi Monastery, 1219, fol. 14, 30-33, 38-39	Mount Athos	Greece	CSNTM

[top]

=== Lectionaries 1901–2000 ===
#	Date	Contents	Script	Pages	Institution	City, State	Country	Images
ℓ 1901	12th	Gospels^{P}	αω	6	Vatopedi Monastery, 1219, fol. 19-20, 34-37	Mount Athos	Greece	CSNTM
ℓ 1902	9th	Gospels^{P}	ΑΩ	4	Vatopedi Monastery, 1219, fol. 53-56	Mount Athos	Greece	CSNTM
ℓ 1903	9th	Gospels^{P}	ΑΩ	1	Vatopedi Monastery, 1219, fol. 57	Mount Athos	Greece	CSNTM
[ℓ 1904]=ℓ 358								
ℓ 1905	10th	Gospels^{P}	ΑΩ	1	Vatopedi Monastery, 1219, fol. 61	Mount Athos	Greece	CSNTM
ℓ 1906	10th	Gospels^{P}	ΑΩ	2	Vatopedi Monastery, 1219, fol. 64	Mount Athos	Greece	CSNTM
ℓ 1907	9th	Gospels^{P}	ΑΩ	2	Vatopedi Monastery, 1219, fol. 66-67	Mount Athos	Greece	CSNTM
ℓ 1908	13th	†Gospels^{sk}	αω	181	Kipoureon Monastery	Lixouri, Cephalonia	Greece	
ℓ 1909	16th	Gospels + Apostles	αω	226	Owner Unknown			
ℓ 1910	14th	†Gospels^{esk}	αω	136	Civic Library, 34 B 19	Bassano del Grappa	Italy	
ℓ 1911	12th	Gospels^{sel}	αω	192	Malatestiana Library, Malatestiana D.XXVII.4	Cesena	Italy	BM
ℓ 1912	12th	†Gospels^{esk}	αω	209	Malatestiana Library, Malatestiana D.XXIX.2 (fol. 3-211)	Cesena	Italy	BM
ℓ 1913	14th	Gospels^{P}	αω	2	Malatestiana Library, Malatestiana D.XXIX.2 (fol. 1-2)	Cesena	Italy	BM
ℓ 1914	14th	Gospels^{P}	αω	1	National Library, II. II. 506	Florence	Italy	
ℓ 1915	16th	Gospels + Apostles^{k}	αω	207	Chiesa Madre, 2	Galatone	Italy	
ℓ 1916	11th	Gospels^{P}	αω	2	Ambrosiana Library, B. 60 sup., fol. I. II	Milan	Italy	
ℓ 1917	10th	Gospels^{P}	ΑΩ	Frg	Ambrosiana Library, B. 63 sup., fol. I	Milan	Italy	
ℓ 1918	13th	Apostles^{P}	αω	2	Ambrosiana Library, C. 7 sup	Milan	Italy	
[ℓ 1919]								
ℓ 1920	13th	Gospels^{P}	αω	1	Ambrosiana Library, I. 94 suss., fol. 67	Milan	Italy	INTF
ℓ 1921	17th	Gospels + Apostles^{ek}	αω	141	University of Messina, F. V. 294, fol. 1-75. 111-176	Messina	Italy	
ℓ 1922	12th	Gospels	αω	315	Greek Orthodox Church of Saints Peter and Paul	Naples	Italy	
ℓ 1923	12th	Gospels^{P}	αω	2	Antoniana Library, MM	Padua	Italy	
ℓ 1924	11th	†Gospels^{esk}	αω	212	Central Library, 2Qq F 152	Palermo	Italy	
ℓ 1925	16th	Gospels + Apostles^{k}	αω	221	Central Library, 2Qq C 235, fol. 53-273	Palermo	Italy	
ℓ 1926	11th	Gospels^{P}	ΑΩ	6	State Archive, Raccolta manoscritti 85	Parma	Italy	
ℓ 1927	13th	†Gospels^{e}	αω	256	Seminary Library, 1	Piana degli Albanesi	Italy	
ℓ 1928	13th	†Gospels	αω	204	Seminary Library, 2	Piana degli Albanesi	Italy	
ℓ 1929	13th	Gospels + Apostles^{P}	αω	44	Vatican Library, Vat. gr. 1840, fol. 5-48	Vatican City	Vatican City	
ℓ 1930	12th	Gospels + Apostles^{P}	αω P^{U}	63	Vatican Library, Vat. gr. 1844, fol. 31-87. 118-123	Vatican City	Vatican City	INTF
ℓ 1931	1519	Gospels + Apostles^{sel}	αω	196	Vatican Library, Vat. gr. 2007	Vatican City	Vatican City	INTF
ℓ 1932	16th	Gospels + Apostles^{sel}	αω	207	Vatican Library, Vat. gr. 2032	Vatican City	Vatican City	
ℓ 1933	1552	Gospels^{esk}	αω	178	Vatican Library, Vat. gr. 2311	Vatican City	Vatican City	
ℓ 1934	12th	†Gospels^{e}	αω	197	Vatican Library, Vat. gr. 2320	Vatican City	Vatican City	
ℓ 1935	14th	†Gospels^{esk}	αω P^{O}	139	Vatican Library, Vat. gr. 2502	Vatican City	Vatican City	
ℓ 1936	15th	†Gospels + Apostles^{sk}	αω P^{O}	168	Vatican Library, Vat. gr. 2512	Vatican City	Vatican City	
ℓ 1937	16th	Apostles^{esk}	αω	144	Vatican Library, Vat. gr. 2542	Vatican City	Vatican City	
ℓ 1938	1498	†Gospels^{esk}	αω	165	Vatican Library, Vat. gr. 2560	Vatican City	Vatican City	
ℓ 1939	11th	Gospels^{P}	αω	2	Vatican Library, Vat. gr. 2560	Vatican City	Vatican City	
ℓ 1940	1297	†Gospels^{esk}	αω	200	Vatican Library, Vat. gr. 2563	Vatican City	Vatican City	
ℓ 1941	14th	Gospels^{e}	αω	494	Vatican Library, Vat. gr. 2574, II	Vatican City	Vatican City	
ℓ 1942	11th	†Gospels^{esk}	ΑΩ	257	Turin National University Library, B.II.22	Turin	Italy	INTF
ℓ 1943	13th	Gospels^{P}	αω	2	Marciana National Library, Gr. Z. 27 (341)	Venice	Italy	
ℓ 1944	13th	Gospels^{P}	αω P^{O}	4	Marciana National Library, Gr. I,49 (1213), fol. 251-254	Venice	Italy	
ℓ 1945	9th	Gospels^{P}	ΑΩ	2	Marciana National Library, Gr. I,66 (12057)	Venice	Italy	
ℓ 1946	13th/ 14th	†Gospels^{esk}	αω	90	National and University Library, Ms. 1914	Strasbourg	France	BnF
[ℓ 1947]								
ℓ 1948	11th/12th	†Gospels^{esk}	αω	185	Bavarian State Library, Cod. graec. 609	Munich	Germany	INTF
ℓ 1949	13th	†Gospels + Apostles^{sel}	αω	122	Scheyern Monastery, Ms. 18	Scheyern	Germany	
ℓ 1950	15th	Gospels + Apostles^{P}	αω	36	University Library, Gr. 67, fol. 86-121	Uppsala	Sweden	UU
ℓ 1951	11th	Gospels^{esk}	αω	288	Museum of the Bible, SIG.MS.000848	Washington, DC	United States	
ℓ 1952	9th	Apostles^{P}	ΑΩ P^{U}	1	Bodleian Library, Auct. F. 6. 25*	Oxford	United Kingdom	
ℓ 1953	9th	Gospels	ΑΩ P^{U}	131	Bodleian Library, Barocci 206, fol. 1-131	Oxford	United Kingdom	DB
ℓ 1954	9th	Gospels^{P}	ΑΩ P^{U}	119	Bodleian Library, Selden Supra 2, fol. 2, 7-99, 108-132	Oxford	United Kingdom	
ℓ 1955	9th	Gospels^{P}	ΑΩ P^{U}	76	Bodleian Library, Selden Supra 3	Oxford	United Kingdom	
ℓ 1956	11th	Gospels^{P}	αω	274	Owner Unknown			
ℓ 1957	10th	†Gospels^{esk}	ΑΩ	200	Chester Beatty Library, CBL W 138	Dublin	Ireland	CSNTM
ℓ 1958	11th	†Gospels^{e}	αω	183	Houghton Library, Harvard University, MS Gr 25	Cambridge, MA	United States	
ℓ 1959	13th/ 14th	Gospels^{P}	αω	2	University of Chicago Library, Ms. 939 (Goodspeed)	Chicago, IL	United States	TUOCL
ℓ 1960	13th/ 14th	Gospels^{P}	αω	4	University of Chicago Library, Ms. 1341 (Goodspeed)	Chicago, IL	United States	TUOCL
ℓ 1961	13th/ 14th	Gospels^{P}	αω	4	University of Chicago Library, Ms. 937 (Goodspeed)	Chicago, IL	United States	TUOCL
ℓ 1962	13th/ 14th	Gospels^{P}	αω	1	University of Chicago Library, Ms. 1342 (Goodspeed)	Chicago, IL	United States	TUOCL
ℓ 1963	11th/12th	†Gospels + Apostles^{esk}	αω	207	University of Chicago Library, Ms. 947 (Goodspeed)	Chicago, IL	United States	TUOCL
ℓ 1964	12th	†Gospels^{esk}	αω	106	University of Chicago Library, Ms. 948 (Goodspeed)	Chicago, IL	United States	TUOCL
ℓ 1965	12th	Gospels^{esk}	αω	181	Duke University, Greek MS 010	Durham, NC	United States	DU
ℓ 1966	12th	Gospels^{e}	αω	224	Duke University, Greek MS 012	Durham, NC	United States	DU
ℓ 1967	11th	Gospels^{esk}	αω	241	Duke University, Greek MS 024	Durham, NC	United States	DU
ℓ 1967	11th	Gospels^{esk}	αω	1	Bill Eubanks	Fort Worth, TX	United States	CSNTM
ℓ 1967	11th	Gospels^{esk}	αω	1	David L. Brown	Oak Creek, WI	United States	CSNTM
ℓ 1967	11th	Gospels^{esk}	αω	2	Owner Unknown			CSNTM
ℓ 1968	1544	Gospels + Apostles^{sk}	αω	336	University Library, RB Stewart Ms No. 1	Sydney	Australia	
ℓ 1969	12th	Gospels^{esk}	αω	274	National Museum, Mošin 3	Ochrid	North Macedonia	
ℓ 1970	11th	†Gospels^{e}	αω	286	National Museum, Mošin 4	Ochrid	North Macedonia	
ℓ 1971	12th	Gospels^{esk}	αω	294	National Museum, Mošin 5	Ochrid	North Macedonia	
ℓ 1972	13th	Gospels^{P}	αω	58	National Museum, Mošin 6	Ochrid	North Macedonia	
ℓ 1973	11th	†Gospels^{esk}	αω	215	National Museum, Mošin 7	Ochrid	North Macedonia	
ℓ 1974	13th	†Gospels^{e}	αω	206	National Museum, Mošin 8	Ochrid	North Macedonia	
ℓ 1975	1325	Gospels^{P}	αω	119	National Museum, Mošin 9	Ochrid	North Macedonia	
ℓ 1976	14th	†Gospels^{e}	αω	162	National Museum, Mošin 10	Ochrid	North Macedonia	
ℓ 1977	12th	Gospels + Apostles^{sk}	αω	310	National Museum, Mošin 11	Ochrid	North Macedonia	
ℓ 1978	14th	Gospels + Apostles^{esk}	αω	186	National Museum, Mošin 12	Ochrid	North Macedonia	
ℓ 1979	13th	Apostles^{e}	αω	173	National Museum, Mošin 17	Ochrid	North Macedonia	
ℓ 1980	13th	Gospels^{P}	αω	46	National Center of Manuscripts, Gr. 15	Tbilisi	Georgia	CSNTM
ℓ 1981	12th	Apostles^{P}	αω P^{U}	121	Herzog August Library, Codd. Gud. Gr. 112 (fol. 138/141. 144/149: 2360)	Wolfenbüttel	Germany	
[ℓ 1982]=ℓ 407								
ℓ 1983	14th	Gospels^{esk}	αω	243	University of California, Davis, Shields Library, BS2565 A24 no. 1983	Davis, CA	United States	UC
ℓ 1984	11th	†Gospels^{esk}	αω	203	Christ's College, GG. 2.12 (MS 298)	Cambridge	United Kingdom	CSNTM
ℓ 1985	15th	†Gospels + Apostles^{esk}	αω	246	Christ's College, GG.2.3 (MS 253)	Cambridge	United Kingdom	CSNTM
ℓ 1986	14th	Gospels^{P}	αω	6	Trinity College, O.9.17 (fol. A-D. E-F)	Cambridge	United Kingdom	
ℓ 1987	12th	Gospels^{e}	αω	88	Pembroke College, Ms. 310	Cambridge	United Kingdom	
ℓ 1988	14th	Gospels^{P}	αω P^{O}	32	Cambridge University Library, Add. Mss. 4489	Cambridge	United Kingdom	
ℓ 1989	8th	Gospels^{P}	αω P^{U}	16	Cambridge University Library, Add. Mss. 4489	Cambridge	United Kingdom	
ℓ 1990	9th	Gospels^{P}	ΑΩ	1	Trinity College, MS 2885	Dublin	Ireland	TC
ℓ 1991	11th	Gospels^{P}	αω	1	Trinity College, MS 2886	Dublin	Ireland	TC
ℓ 1992	12th	Gospels^{P}	αω	3	British Library, Add MS 27300, fol. A. B. 235	London	United Kingdom	
[ℓ 1993]								
[ℓ 1994]								
ℓ 1995	1148	Gospels^{e}	αω	175	Museum of the Bible, MOTB.MS.000455	Washington, DC	United States	INTF
ℓ 1996	12th	†Gospels^{esk}	αω	249	Robert McCarthy Collection, BM 2326	London	United Kingdom	INTF
ℓ 1997	14th	Apostles^{esk}	αω	152	John Rylands University Library of Manchester, Gr. Ms. 23	Manchester	United Kingdom	
ℓ 1998	11th	Gospels^{e}	αω	364	Panagia Hozoviotissa Monastery	Amorgos	Greece	
ℓ 1999	11th	†Gospels^{e}	αω	99	Amorgos, Panagia Hozoviotissa Monastery	Amorgos	Greece	
ℓ 2000	12th	Gospels^{e}	αω	342	Panagia Hozoviotissa Monastery	Amorgos	Greece	

[top]

== Gallery ==
=== Uncial Lectionaries ===
Photos of Uncial Lectionaries

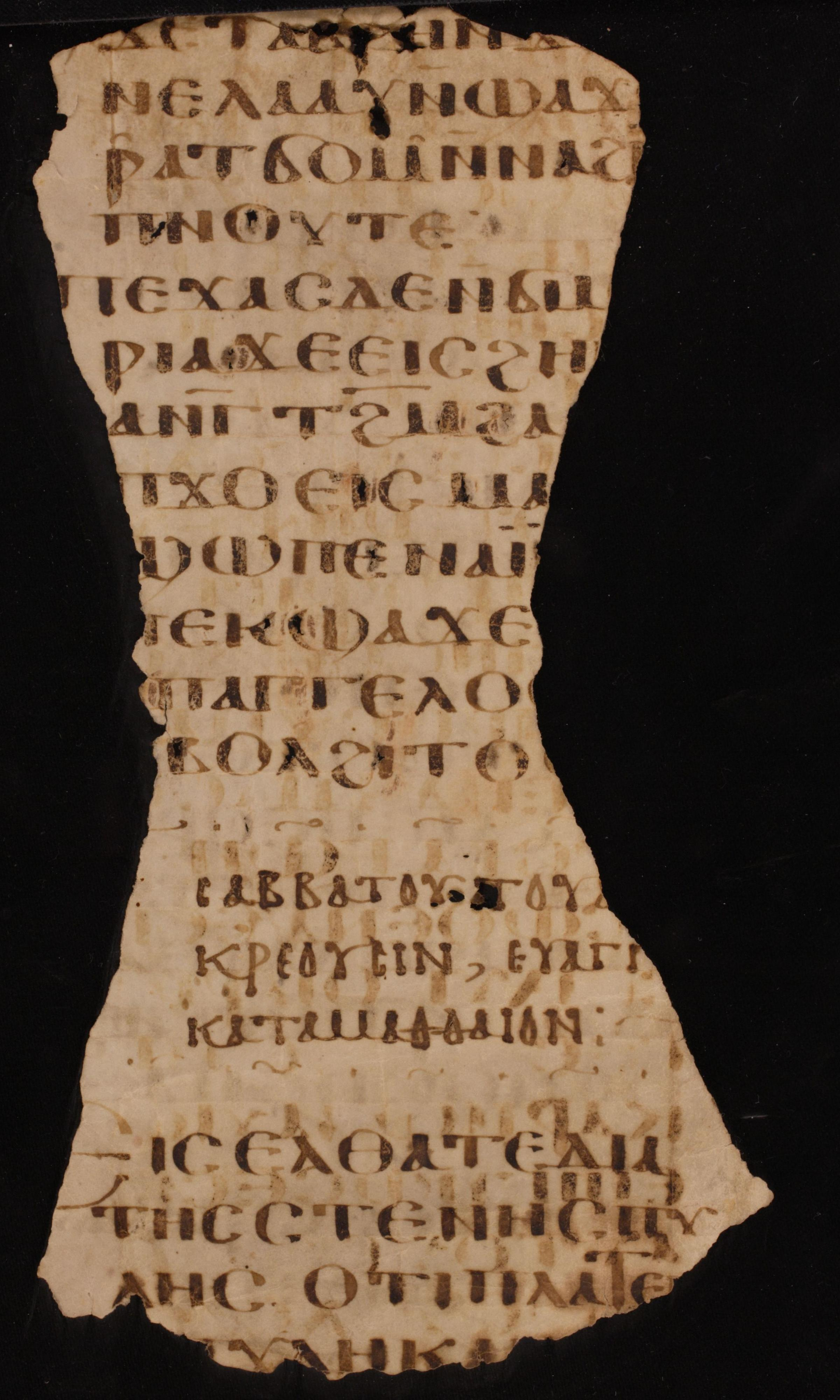
ℓ 1602 The only folio

=== Minuscule Lectionaries ===
Photos of Minuscule Lectionaries

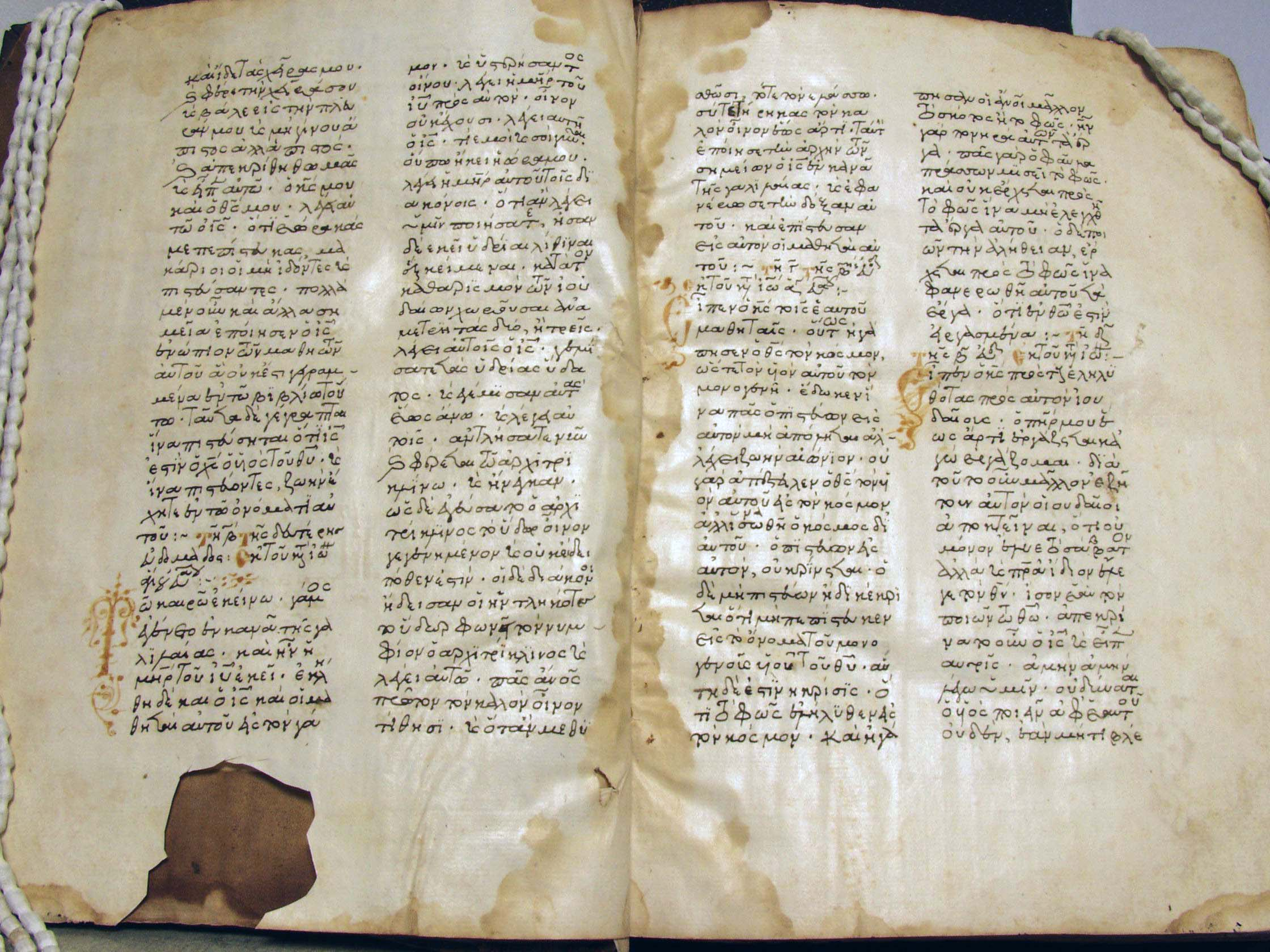
ℓ 1683

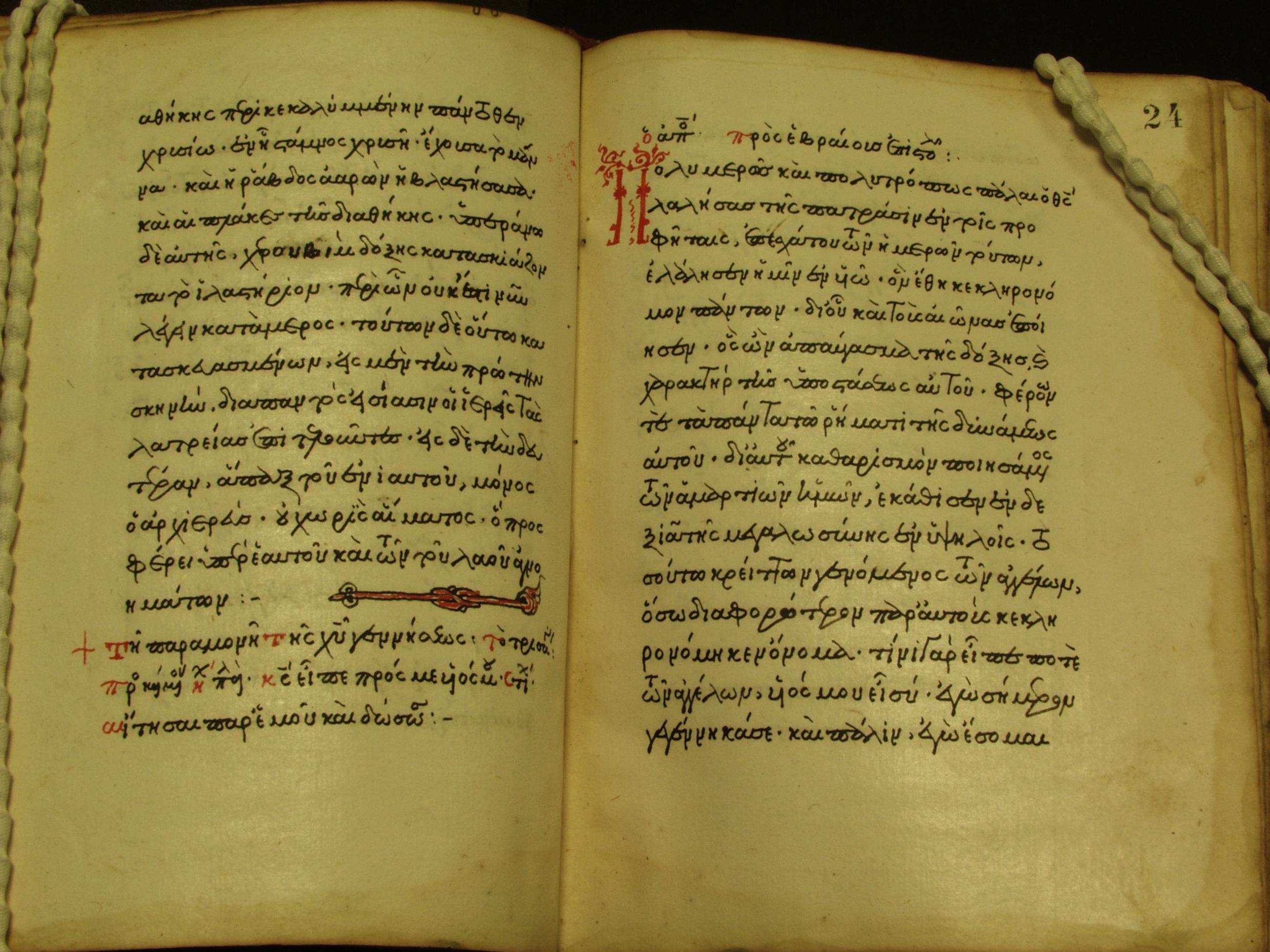
ℓ 1686

== See also ==
Lists

- Categories of New Testament manuscripts
- List of New Testament papyri
- List of New Testament uncials
- List of New Testament minuscules
- List of New Testament Latin manuscripts

Articles

- Novum Testamentum Graece
- Biblical manuscript
- Palaeography
- Textual criticism

== Bibliography ==
- Dr. Peter M. Head. The Early Greek Bible Manuscript Project: New Testament Lectionary Manuscripts.
- K. Aland, M. Welte, B. Köster, K. Junack, Kurzgefasste Liste der griechischen Handschriften des Neuen Testaments, Walter de Gruyter, Berlin, New York 1994, pp. 219 ff.
- Aland, Kurt; Barbara Aland (1995). The Text of the New Testament: An Introduction to the Critical Editions and to the Theory and Practice of Modern Textual Criticism. Translated by Erroll F. Rhodes (2nd ed.). Grand Rapids, Michigan: William B. Eerdmans Publishing Co. ISBN 0-8028-4098-1.
- Seid, Timothy. "A Table of Greek Manuscripts". Interpreting Ancient Manuscripts. Retrieved June 22, 2007.
- Black M., Aland K., Die alten Übersetzungen des Neuen Testaments, die Kirchenväterzitate und Lektionare: der gegenwärtige Stand ihrer Erforschung und ihre Bedeutung für die griechische Textgeschichte, Wissenschaftliche Beirat des Instituts für neutestamentliche Textforschung, Berlin 1972.
- Carroll D. Osburn, The Greek Lectionaries of the New Testament, in. The Text of the New Testament in Contemporary Research, ed. Bart D. Ehrman and Michael W. Holmes, William B. Eerdmans Publishing Company, Grand Rapids 1995, pp. 61–74.
