= Panagia Hozoviotissa Monastery =

Monastery in Amorgos, Greece

- Μονή της Παναγίας της Χοζοβιώτισσας
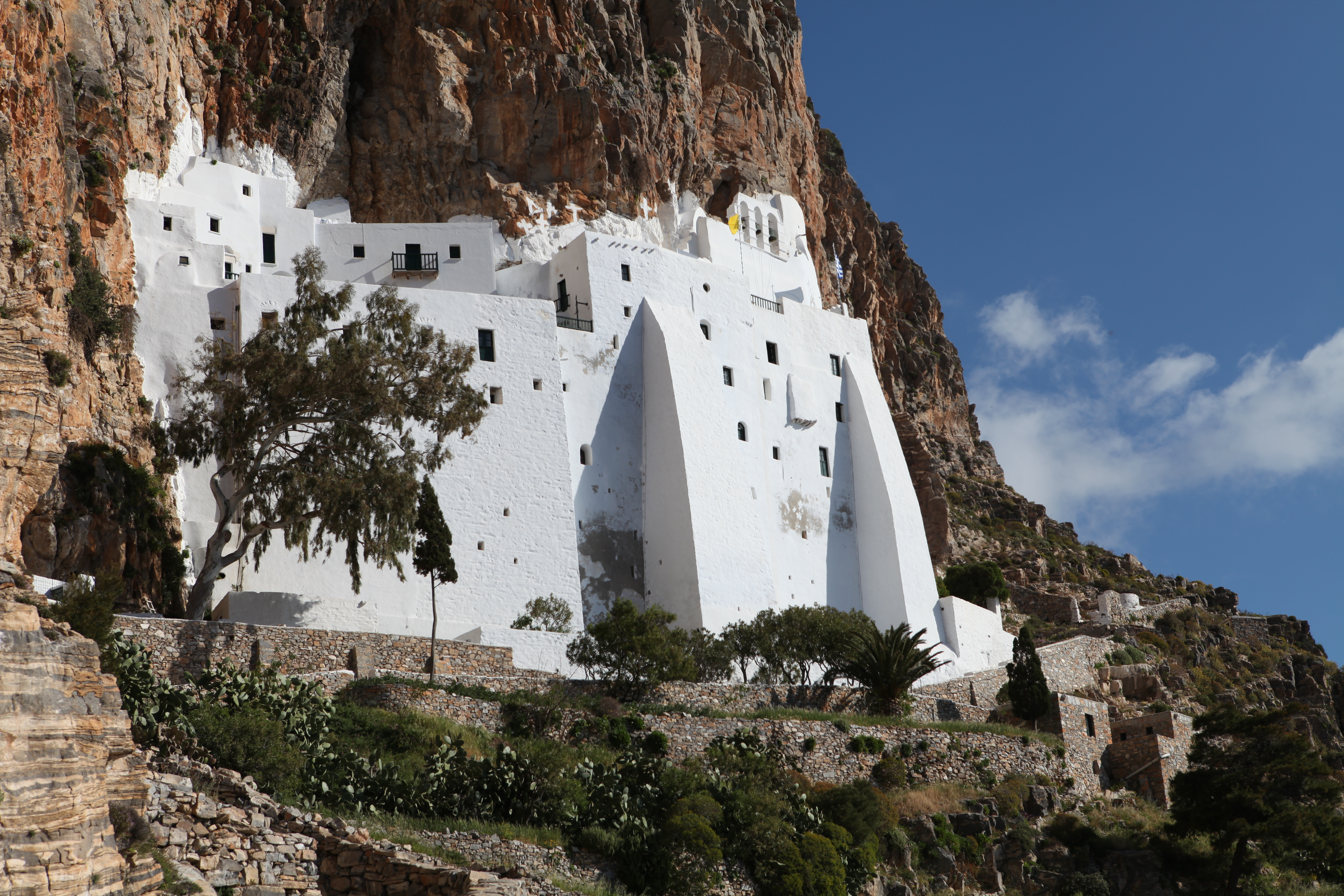
- Interactive map of Panagia Hozoviotissa Monastery

Monastery information
- Established: 1088
- Dedicated to: Presentation of Theotokos
- Celebration date: November 20 & 21
- Diocese: Metropolis of Thira, Amorgos and the Islands

Site
- Location: Chora of Amorgos, Amorgos
- Country: Greece
- Coordinates: 36°50′5″N 25°54′34″E

The Panagia Hozoviotissa Monastery (Greek: Μονή της Παναγίας της Χοζοβιώτισσας) is a Greek Orthodox monastery on the island of Amorgos. It is built on the steep south coast of the island, at an altitude of 300 meters.

The monastery took its name from the corruption of "Hozivitissa" or "Kozivitissa", which in turn comes from the toponym Hozeva or Koziva (today Wadi Qelt, Palestine), where the orthodox monastery of Saint George was located. According to local tradition, the icon of Panagia Hozoviotissa arrived at the time of the Byzantine Iconoclasm by sea in the bay of Agia Anna, near the monastery. The monastery is believed to have been built in the 9th century, at the time of the icon's arrival. The emperor Alexios I Komnenos granted with a royal chrysobullus stauropigian rights to the monastery in 1088. A silver hexapod in the monastery states that it was renovated by Alexios Komnenos.

The monastery is built on a cliff. Access is by climbing 271 steps. It has a length of 40 meters and a maximum width of 5. The building has eight levels which communicate with each other with staircases built or carved into the rock. Inside the building are Byzantine or pointed arches, built of porolit from Milos. The area of the monastery includes numerous cells, bank, kitchens, warehouses, presses, cisterns and wells. The catholicon of the monastery is a single-chamber arched roof and in it are the two inscribed icons of Panagia Hozoviotissa or CHOZIVITA and the iron chisel of the archmaster. The entrance to the monastery is located 10 meters from the ground and was accessed by a hanging ladder.

On New Year's Day 1975, during bad weather, a landslide was triggered on the cliff above the monastery and fell into the monastery, destroying the roof of the refectory, while two rocks pierced several floors, with the largest reaching the ground floor, penetrating three floors. Cracks appeared in the outer walls of the cells of the monastery and part of the parapet of the roof fell. Urgent maintenance works followed, with the underpinning of the first basement, the fixing of the cracked walls, the removal of the foundations and the reconstruction of the reinforced concrete roof.

Panagia Hozoviotissa is the patron saint of the island and celebrates on November 20 and 21.
